

263001–263100 

|-bgcolor=#E9E9E9
| 263001 ||  || — || March 13, 2007 || Mount Lemmon || Mount Lemmon Survey || — || align=right | 2.0 km || 
|-id=002 bgcolor=#d6d6d6
| 263002 ||  || — || March 13, 2007 || Mount Lemmon || Mount Lemmon Survey || EOS || align=right | 2.9 km || 
|-id=003 bgcolor=#E9E9E9
| 263003 ||  || — || March 9, 2007 || Mount Lemmon || Mount Lemmon Survey || — || align=right | 3.1 km || 
|-id=004 bgcolor=#d6d6d6
| 263004 ||  || — || March 9, 2007 || Mount Lemmon || Mount Lemmon Survey || — || align=right | 3.0 km || 
|-id=005 bgcolor=#d6d6d6
| 263005 ||  || — || March 9, 2007 || Mount Lemmon || Mount Lemmon Survey || — || align=right | 2.8 km || 
|-id=006 bgcolor=#d6d6d6
| 263006 ||  || — || March 9, 2007 || Mount Lemmon || Mount Lemmon Survey || — || align=right | 2.6 km || 
|-id=007 bgcolor=#E9E9E9
| 263007 ||  || — || March 12, 2007 || Kitt Peak || Spacewatch || — || align=right | 1.8 km || 
|-id=008 bgcolor=#E9E9E9
| 263008 ||  || — || March 12, 2007 || Mount Lemmon || Mount Lemmon Survey || NEM || align=right | 2.4 km || 
|-id=009 bgcolor=#d6d6d6
| 263009 ||  || — || March 12, 2007 || Mount Lemmon || Mount Lemmon Survey || — || align=right | 4.1 km || 
|-id=010 bgcolor=#E9E9E9
| 263010 ||  || — || March 12, 2007 || Mount Lemmon || Mount Lemmon Survey || — || align=right | 3.4 km || 
|-id=011 bgcolor=#d6d6d6
| 263011 ||  || — || March 15, 2007 || Kitt Peak || Spacewatch || — || align=right | 4.7 km || 
|-id=012 bgcolor=#C2FFFF
| 263012 ||  || — || March 11, 2007 || Mount Lemmon || Mount Lemmon Survey || L5 || align=right | 10 km || 
|-id=013 bgcolor=#d6d6d6
| 263013 ||  || — || March 12, 2007 || Kitt Peak || Spacewatch || HYG || align=right | 3.3 km || 
|-id=014 bgcolor=#d6d6d6
| 263014 ||  || — || March 14, 2007 || Socorro || LINEAR || — || align=right | 3.7 km || 
|-id=015 bgcolor=#d6d6d6
| 263015 ||  || — || March 11, 2007 || Mount Lemmon || Mount Lemmon Survey || HYG || align=right | 3.7 km || 
|-id=016 bgcolor=#d6d6d6
| 263016 ||  || — || March 14, 2007 || Kitt Peak || Spacewatch || — || align=right | 4.4 km || 
|-id=017 bgcolor=#d6d6d6
| 263017 ||  || — || March 13, 2007 || Kitt Peak || Spacewatch || — || align=right | 2.8 km || 
|-id=018 bgcolor=#d6d6d6
| 263018 ||  || — || March 15, 2007 || Kitt Peak || Spacewatch || THM || align=right | 2.3 km || 
|-id=019 bgcolor=#d6d6d6
| 263019 ||  || — || March 9, 2007 || Kitt Peak || Spacewatch || EOS || align=right | 2.9 km || 
|-id=020 bgcolor=#d6d6d6
| 263020 ||  || — || March 12, 2007 || Catalina || CSS || CHA || align=right | 3.0 km || 
|-id=021 bgcolor=#E9E9E9
| 263021 ||  || — || March 10, 2007 || Palomar || NEAT || — || align=right | 3.1 km || 
|-id=022 bgcolor=#d6d6d6
| 263022 ||  || — || March 13, 2007 || Kitt Peak || Spacewatch || HYG || align=right | 4.0 km || 
|-id=023 bgcolor=#d6d6d6
| 263023 ||  || — || March 8, 2007 || Palomar || NEAT || 7:4* || align=right | 6.7 km || 
|-id=024 bgcolor=#E9E9E9
| 263024 ||  || — || March 8, 2007 || Palomar || NEAT || — || align=right | 3.6 km || 
|-id=025 bgcolor=#d6d6d6
| 263025 ||  || — || March 9, 2007 || Mount Lemmon || Mount Lemmon Survey || THM || align=right | 2.9 km || 
|-id=026 bgcolor=#E9E9E9
| 263026 ||  || — || March 13, 2007 || Mount Lemmon || Mount Lemmon Survey || WIT || align=right | 1.2 km || 
|-id=027 bgcolor=#d6d6d6
| 263027 ||  || — || March 14, 2007 || Mount Lemmon || Mount Lemmon Survey || EOS || align=right | 3.3 km || 
|-id=028 bgcolor=#d6d6d6
| 263028 ||  || — || March 14, 2007 || Mount Lemmon || Mount Lemmon Survey || — || align=right | 3.3 km || 
|-id=029 bgcolor=#d6d6d6
| 263029 ||  || — || March 13, 2007 || Kitt Peak || Spacewatch || KOR || align=right | 2.2 km || 
|-id=030 bgcolor=#d6d6d6
| 263030 ||  || — || March 20, 2007 || Kitt Peak || Spacewatch || TRE || align=right | 3.0 km || 
|-id=031 bgcolor=#d6d6d6
| 263031 ||  || — || March 20, 2007 || Kitt Peak || Spacewatch || HYG || align=right | 4.2 km || 
|-id=032 bgcolor=#d6d6d6
| 263032 ||  || — || March 26, 2007 || Mount Lemmon || Mount Lemmon Survey || — || align=right | 4.7 km || 
|-id=033 bgcolor=#d6d6d6
| 263033 ||  || — || March 25, 2007 || Mount Lemmon || Mount Lemmon Survey || URS || align=right | 5.1 km || 
|-id=034 bgcolor=#E9E9E9
| 263034 ||  || — || March 26, 2007 || Mount Lemmon || Mount Lemmon Survey || WIT || align=right | 1.1 km || 
|-id=035 bgcolor=#d6d6d6
| 263035 ||  || — || April 12, 2007 || Črni Vrh || Črni Vrh || — || align=right | 5.2 km || 
|-id=036 bgcolor=#d6d6d6
| 263036 ||  || — || April 7, 2007 || Mount Lemmon || Mount Lemmon Survey || THM || align=right | 3.2 km || 
|-id=037 bgcolor=#d6d6d6
| 263037 ||  || — || April 14, 2007 || Mount Lemmon || Mount Lemmon Survey || KOR || align=right | 1.5 km || 
|-id=038 bgcolor=#d6d6d6
| 263038 ||  || — || April 15, 2007 || Kitt Peak || Spacewatch || — || align=right | 3.1 km || 
|-id=039 bgcolor=#d6d6d6
| 263039 ||  || — || April 14, 2007 || Kitt Peak || Spacewatch || — || align=right | 3.5 km || 
|-id=040 bgcolor=#d6d6d6
| 263040 ||  || — || April 14, 2007 || Kitt Peak || Spacewatch || HYG || align=right | 2.7 km || 
|-id=041 bgcolor=#d6d6d6
| 263041 ||  || — || April 14, 2007 || Kitt Peak || Spacewatch || — || align=right | 4.2 km || 
|-id=042 bgcolor=#d6d6d6
| 263042 ||  || — || April 15, 2007 || Catalina || CSS || — || align=right | 4.2 km || 
|-id=043 bgcolor=#d6d6d6
| 263043 ||  || — || April 15, 2007 || Socorro || LINEAR || LIX || align=right | 5.3 km || 
|-id=044 bgcolor=#d6d6d6
| 263044 ||  || — || April 19, 2007 || Great Shefford || P. Birtwhistle || — || align=right | 3.6 km || 
|-id=045 bgcolor=#d6d6d6
| 263045 ||  || — || April 16, 2007 || Catalina || CSS || — || align=right | 4.3 km || 
|-id=046 bgcolor=#d6d6d6
| 263046 ||  || — || April 16, 2007 || Catalina || CSS || — || align=right | 3.4 km || 
|-id=047 bgcolor=#d6d6d6
| 263047 ||  || — || April 18, 2007 || Kitt Peak || Spacewatch || — || align=right | 3.5 km || 
|-id=048 bgcolor=#d6d6d6
| 263048 ||  || — || April 18, 2007 || Kitt Peak || Spacewatch || — || align=right | 4.1 km || 
|-id=049 bgcolor=#E9E9E9
| 263049 ||  || — || April 19, 2007 || Mount Lemmon || Mount Lemmon Survey || AGN || align=right | 1.5 km || 
|-id=050 bgcolor=#d6d6d6
| 263050 ||  || — || April 20, 2007 || Kitt Peak || Spacewatch || — || align=right | 3.2 km || 
|-id=051 bgcolor=#d6d6d6
| 263051 ||  || — || April 20, 2007 || Kitt Peak || Spacewatch || — || align=right | 4.2 km || 
|-id=052 bgcolor=#d6d6d6
| 263052 ||  || — || April 20, 2007 || Kitt Peak || Spacewatch || — || align=right | 3.6 km || 
|-id=053 bgcolor=#d6d6d6
| 263053 ||  || — || April 20, 2007 || Kitt Peak || Spacewatch || Tj (2.93) || align=right | 3.6 km || 
|-id=054 bgcolor=#d6d6d6
| 263054 ||  || — || April 22, 2007 || Kitt Peak || Spacewatch || — || align=right | 4.8 km || 
|-id=055 bgcolor=#d6d6d6
| 263055 ||  || — || April 22, 2007 || Kitt Peak || Spacewatch || — || align=right | 3.2 km || 
|-id=056 bgcolor=#d6d6d6
| 263056 ||  || — || April 23, 2007 || Catalina || CSS || — || align=right | 4.7 km || 
|-id=057 bgcolor=#d6d6d6
| 263057 ||  || — || April 23, 2007 || Catalina || CSS || — || align=right | 4.2 km || 
|-id=058 bgcolor=#d6d6d6
| 263058 ||  || — || April 23, 2007 || Kitt Peak || Spacewatch || — || align=right | 3.4 km || 
|-id=059 bgcolor=#d6d6d6
| 263059 ||  || — || April 23, 2007 || Kitt Peak || Spacewatch || — || align=right | 4.1 km || 
|-id=060 bgcolor=#d6d6d6
| 263060 ||  || — || April 19, 2007 || Kitt Peak || Spacewatch || — || align=right | 5.3 km || 
|-id=061 bgcolor=#d6d6d6
| 263061 ||  || — || April 18, 2007 || Anderson Mesa || LONEOS || — || align=right | 6.0 km || 
|-id=062 bgcolor=#d6d6d6
| 263062 ||  || — || April 16, 2007 || Catalina || CSS || — || align=right | 4.4 km || 
|-id=063 bgcolor=#d6d6d6
| 263063 ||  || — || April 22, 2007 || Mount Lemmon || Mount Lemmon Survey || HYG || align=right | 3.6 km || 
|-id=064 bgcolor=#d6d6d6
| 263064 ||  || — || May 7, 2007 || Kitt Peak || Spacewatch || — || align=right | 3.1 km || 
|-id=065 bgcolor=#d6d6d6
| 263065 ||  || — || May 9, 2007 || Kitt Peak || Spacewatch || — || align=right | 4.1 km || 
|-id=066 bgcolor=#d6d6d6
| 263066 ||  || — || May 11, 2007 || Catalina || CSS || URS || align=right | 5.5 km || 
|-id=067 bgcolor=#d6d6d6
| 263067 ||  || — || May 10, 2007 || Kitt Peak || Spacewatch || EOS || align=right | 3.3 km || 
|-id=068 bgcolor=#d6d6d6
| 263068 ||  || — || May 12, 2007 || Mount Lemmon || Mount Lemmon Survey || — || align=right | 3.4 km || 
|-id=069 bgcolor=#d6d6d6
| 263069 ||  || — || May 12, 2007 || Mount Lemmon || Mount Lemmon Survey || — || align=right | 5.2 km || 
|-id=070 bgcolor=#E9E9E9
| 263070 ||  || — || May 17, 2007 || Catalina || CSS || — || align=right | 1.7 km || 
|-id=071 bgcolor=#d6d6d6
| 263071 ||  || — || May 17, 2007 || Catalina || CSS || — || align=right | 4.7 km || 
|-id=072 bgcolor=#d6d6d6
| 263072 ||  || — || June 8, 2007 || Kitt Peak || Spacewatch || — || align=right | 4.7 km || 
|-id=073 bgcolor=#d6d6d6
| 263073 ||  || — || June 14, 2007 || Kitt Peak || Spacewatch || HYG || align=right | 3.6 km || 
|-id=074 bgcolor=#d6d6d6
| 263074 ||  || — || July 13, 2007 || La Sagra || OAM Obs. || EUP || align=right | 7.5 km || 
|-id=075 bgcolor=#FA8072
| 263075 ||  || — || July 22, 2007 || La Sagra || OAM Obs. || H || align=right | 1.0 km || 
|-id=076 bgcolor=#fefefe
| 263076 ||  || — || September 11, 2007 || Remanzacco || Remanzacco Obs. || — || align=right data-sort-value="0.72" | 720 m || 
|-id=077 bgcolor=#fefefe
| 263077 ||  || — || September 11, 2007 || Kitt Peak || Spacewatch || FLO || align=right | 1.0 km || 
|-id=078 bgcolor=#C2FFFF
| 263078 ||  || — || September 8, 2007 || Siding Spring || SSS || L4 || align=right | 14 km || 
|-id=079 bgcolor=#fefefe
| 263079 ||  || — || September 11, 2007 || Kitt Peak || Spacewatch || FLO || align=right data-sort-value="0.70" | 700 m || 
|-id=080 bgcolor=#C2FFFF
| 263080 ||  || — || September 10, 2007 || Kitt Peak || Spacewatch || L4 || align=right | 8.0 km || 
|-id=081 bgcolor=#fefefe
| 263081 ||  || — || September 12, 2007 || Catalina || CSS || — || align=right | 1.3 km || 
|-id=082 bgcolor=#fefefe
| 263082 ||  || — || September 14, 2007 || Kitt Peak || Spacewatch || FLO || align=right data-sort-value="0.74" | 740 m || 
|-id=083 bgcolor=#fefefe
| 263083 ||  || — || September 11, 2007 || Kitt Peak || Spacewatch || NYS || align=right data-sort-value="0.69" | 690 m || 
|-id=084 bgcolor=#fefefe
| 263084 ||  || — || September 12, 2007 || Mount Lemmon || Mount Lemmon Survey || — || align=right | 1.0 km || 
|-id=085 bgcolor=#d6d6d6
| 263085 ||  || — || September 18, 2007 || Kitt Peak || Spacewatch || — || align=right | 5.4 km || 
|-id=086 bgcolor=#fefefe
| 263086 ||  || — || September 30, 2007 || Kitt Peak || Spacewatch || H || align=right data-sort-value="0.84" | 840 m || 
|-id=087 bgcolor=#fefefe
| 263087 ||  || — || September 25, 2007 || Mount Lemmon || Mount Lemmon Survey || V || align=right data-sort-value="0.79" | 790 m || 
|-id=088 bgcolor=#fefefe
| 263088 ||  || — || October 6, 2007 || Socorro || LINEAR || — || align=right | 1.1 km || 
|-id=089 bgcolor=#fefefe
| 263089 ||  || — || October 6, 2007 || Kitt Peak || Spacewatch || — || align=right | 1.1 km || 
|-id=090 bgcolor=#fefefe
| 263090 ||  || — || October 4, 2007 || Kitt Peak || Spacewatch || FLO || align=right data-sort-value="0.88" | 880 m || 
|-id=091 bgcolor=#E9E9E9
| 263091 ||  || — || October 7, 2007 || Mount Lemmon || Mount Lemmon Survey || — || align=right | 1.4 km || 
|-id=092 bgcolor=#fefefe
| 263092 ||  || — || October 9, 2007 || Catalina || CSS || H || align=right data-sort-value="0.95" | 950 m || 
|-id=093 bgcolor=#fefefe
| 263093 ||  || — || October 8, 2007 || Anderson Mesa || LONEOS || — || align=right | 1.1 km || 
|-id=094 bgcolor=#fefefe
| 263094 ||  || — || October 6, 2007 || Kitt Peak || Spacewatch || — || align=right | 1.2 km || 
|-id=095 bgcolor=#fefefe
| 263095 ||  || — || October 8, 2007 || Catalina || CSS || PHO || align=right | 1.4 km || 
|-id=096 bgcolor=#C2FFFF
| 263096 ||  || — || October 11, 2007 || Socorro || LINEAR || L4 || align=right | 11 km || 
|-id=097 bgcolor=#fefefe
| 263097 ||  || — || October 7, 2007 || Kitt Peak || Spacewatch || V || align=right data-sort-value="0.99" | 990 m || 
|-id=098 bgcolor=#fefefe
| 263098 ||  || — || October 7, 2007 || Kitt Peak || Spacewatch || — || align=right data-sort-value="0.96" | 960 m || 
|-id=099 bgcolor=#fefefe
| 263099 ||  || — || October 7, 2007 || Kitt Peak || Spacewatch || — || align=right data-sort-value="0.85" | 850 m || 
|-id=100 bgcolor=#fefefe
| 263100 ||  || — || October 8, 2007 || Kitt Peak || Spacewatch || — || align=right | 2.5 km || 
|}

263101–263200 

|-bgcolor=#fefefe
| 263101 ||  || — || October 8, 2007 || Mount Lemmon || Mount Lemmon Survey || V || align=right data-sort-value="0.83" | 830 m || 
|-id=102 bgcolor=#fefefe
| 263102 ||  || — || October 9, 2007 || Kitt Peak || Spacewatch || MAS || align=right | 1.0 km || 
|-id=103 bgcolor=#fefefe
| 263103 ||  || — || October 12, 2007 || Kitt Peak || Spacewatch || V || align=right data-sort-value="0.95" | 950 m || 
|-id=104 bgcolor=#fefefe
| 263104 ||  || — || October 12, 2007 || Kitt Peak || Spacewatch || NYS || align=right data-sort-value="0.67" | 670 m || 
|-id=105 bgcolor=#fefefe
| 263105 ||  || — || October 11, 2007 || Kitt Peak || Spacewatch || — || align=right data-sort-value="0.93" | 930 m || 
|-id=106 bgcolor=#fefefe
| 263106 ||  || — || October 15, 2007 || Kitt Peak || Spacewatch || FLO || align=right data-sort-value="0.64" | 640 m || 
|-id=107 bgcolor=#fefefe
| 263107 ||  || — || October 9, 2007 || Kitt Peak || Spacewatch || — || align=right | 1.1 km || 
|-id=108 bgcolor=#fefefe
| 263108 ||  || — || October 11, 2007 || Kitt Peak || Spacewatch || — || align=right data-sort-value="0.95" | 950 m || 
|-id=109 bgcolor=#fefefe
| 263109 ||  || — || October 14, 2007 || Kitt Peak || Spacewatch || — || align=right data-sort-value="0.89" | 890 m || 
|-id=110 bgcolor=#fefefe
| 263110 ||  || — || October 14, 2007 || Kitt Peak || Spacewatch || NYS || align=right | 1.1 km || 
|-id=111 bgcolor=#fefefe
| 263111 ||  || — || October 14, 2007 || Kitt Peak || Spacewatch || — || align=right | 1.2 km || 
|-id=112 bgcolor=#fefefe
| 263112 ||  || — || October 14, 2007 || Mount Lemmon || Mount Lemmon Survey || NYS || align=right | 1.3 km || 
|-id=113 bgcolor=#fefefe
| 263113 ||  || — || October 15, 2007 || Mount Lemmon || Mount Lemmon Survey || — || align=right | 1.1 km || 
|-id=114 bgcolor=#fefefe
| 263114 ||  || — || October 17, 2007 || Catalina || CSS || H || align=right | 1.0 km || 
|-id=115 bgcolor=#fefefe
| 263115 ||  || — || October 16, 2007 || 7300 Observatory || W. K. Y. Yeung || FLO || align=right | 1.3 km || 
|-id=116 bgcolor=#fefefe
| 263116 ||  || — || October 20, 2007 || Catalina || CSS || — || align=right | 1.1 km || 
|-id=117 bgcolor=#fefefe
| 263117 ||  || — || October 19, 2007 || Anderson Mesa || LONEOS || — || align=right data-sort-value="0.96" | 960 m || 
|-id=118 bgcolor=#E9E9E9
| 263118 ||  || — || October 24, 2007 || Mount Lemmon || Mount Lemmon Survey || — || align=right | 1.7 km || 
|-id=119 bgcolor=#fefefe
| 263119 ||  || — || October 30, 2007 || Mount Lemmon || Mount Lemmon Survey || — || align=right data-sort-value="0.91" | 910 m || 
|-id=120 bgcolor=#fefefe
| 263120 ||  || — || October 30, 2007 || Mount Lemmon || Mount Lemmon Survey || — || align=right | 1.00 km || 
|-id=121 bgcolor=#fefefe
| 263121 ||  || — || October 30, 2007 || Kitt Peak || Spacewatch || — || align=right | 2.0 km || 
|-id=122 bgcolor=#C2FFFF
| 263122 ||  || — || November 3, 2007 || Mount Lemmon || Mount Lemmon Survey || L4 || align=right | 11 km || 
|-id=123 bgcolor=#fefefe
| 263123 ||  || — || November 1, 2007 || Kitt Peak || Spacewatch || — || align=right data-sort-value="0.66" | 660 m || 
|-id=124 bgcolor=#fefefe
| 263124 ||  || — || November 1, 2007 || Kitt Peak || Spacewatch || V || align=right data-sort-value="0.76" | 760 m || 
|-id=125 bgcolor=#E9E9E9
| 263125 ||  || — || November 1, 2007 || Kitt Peak || Spacewatch || — || align=right | 1.0 km || 
|-id=126 bgcolor=#fefefe
| 263126 ||  || — || November 1, 2007 || Kitt Peak || Spacewatch || NYS || align=right data-sort-value="0.85" | 850 m || 
|-id=127 bgcolor=#E9E9E9
| 263127 ||  || — || November 4, 2007 || Mount Lemmon || Mount Lemmon Survey || — || align=right | 1.3 km || 
|-id=128 bgcolor=#E9E9E9
| 263128 ||  || — || November 7, 2007 || La Sagra || OAM Obs. || — || align=right | 1.7 km || 
|-id=129 bgcolor=#fefefe
| 263129 ||  || — || November 5, 2007 || Catalina || CSS || V || align=right data-sort-value="0.85" | 850 m || 
|-id=130 bgcolor=#fefefe
| 263130 ||  || — || November 3, 2007 || Socorro || LINEAR || PHO || align=right | 1.5 km || 
|-id=131 bgcolor=#fefefe
| 263131 ||  || — || November 4, 2007 || Socorro || LINEAR || — || align=right data-sort-value="0.79" | 790 m || 
|-id=132 bgcolor=#fefefe
| 263132 ||  || — || November 5, 2007 || Socorro || LINEAR || FLO || align=right data-sort-value="0.80" | 800 m || 
|-id=133 bgcolor=#fefefe
| 263133 ||  || — || November 6, 2007 || Socorro || LINEAR || — || align=right data-sort-value="0.91" | 910 m || 
|-id=134 bgcolor=#fefefe
| 263134 ||  || — || November 1, 2007 || Kitt Peak || Spacewatch || — || align=right | 1.0 km || 
|-id=135 bgcolor=#fefefe
| 263135 ||  || — || November 5, 2007 || Kitt Peak || Spacewatch || — || align=right | 1.3 km || 
|-id=136 bgcolor=#fefefe
| 263136 ||  || — || November 5, 2007 || Purple Mountain || PMO NEO || — || align=right | 1.0 km || 
|-id=137 bgcolor=#fefefe
| 263137 ||  || — || November 4, 2007 || Kitt Peak || Spacewatch || — || align=right data-sort-value="0.91" | 910 m || 
|-id=138 bgcolor=#fefefe
| 263138 ||  || — || November 3, 2007 || Kitt Peak || Spacewatch || FLO || align=right data-sort-value="0.71" | 710 m || 
|-id=139 bgcolor=#fefefe
| 263139 ||  || — || November 6, 2007 || Kitt Peak || Spacewatch || FLO || align=right data-sort-value="0.55" | 550 m || 
|-id=140 bgcolor=#fefefe
| 263140 ||  || — || November 8, 2007 || Mount Lemmon || Mount Lemmon Survey || — || align=right | 1.0 km || 
|-id=141 bgcolor=#fefefe
| 263141 ||  || — || November 4, 2007 || Mount Lemmon || Mount Lemmon Survey || NYS || align=right data-sort-value="0.77" | 770 m || 
|-id=142 bgcolor=#E9E9E9
| 263142 ||  || — || November 7, 2007 || Mount Lemmon || Mount Lemmon Survey || — || align=right | 1.5 km || 
|-id=143 bgcolor=#fefefe
| 263143 ||  || — || November 8, 2007 || Mount Lemmon || Mount Lemmon Survey || NYS || align=right data-sort-value="0.81" | 810 m || 
|-id=144 bgcolor=#fefefe
| 263144 ||  || — || November 5, 2007 || Kitt Peak || Spacewatch || V || align=right data-sort-value="0.84" | 840 m || 
|-id=145 bgcolor=#fefefe
| 263145 ||  || — || November 9, 2007 || Kitt Peak || Spacewatch || — || align=right | 1.1 km || 
|-id=146 bgcolor=#fefefe
| 263146 ||  || — || November 9, 2007 || Mount Lemmon || Mount Lemmon Survey || — || align=right data-sort-value="0.99" | 990 m || 
|-id=147 bgcolor=#fefefe
| 263147 ||  || — || November 9, 2007 || Kitt Peak || Spacewatch || — || align=right data-sort-value="0.85" | 850 m || 
|-id=148 bgcolor=#fefefe
| 263148 ||  || — || November 9, 2007 || Kitt Peak || Spacewatch || MAS || align=right data-sort-value="0.85" | 850 m || 
|-id=149 bgcolor=#fefefe
| 263149 ||  || — || November 7, 2007 || Kitt Peak || Spacewatch || — || align=right data-sort-value="0.62" | 620 m || 
|-id=150 bgcolor=#fefefe
| 263150 ||  || — || November 13, 2007 || Kitt Peak || Spacewatch || — || align=right | 2.2 km || 
|-id=151 bgcolor=#fefefe
| 263151 ||  || — || November 14, 2007 || Bisei SG Center || BATTeRS || — || align=right | 1.2 km || 
|-id=152 bgcolor=#FA8072
| 263152 ||  || — || November 14, 2007 || Anderson Mesa || LONEOS || — || align=right | 2.3 km || 
|-id=153 bgcolor=#fefefe
| 263153 ||  || — || November 15, 2007 || Mount Lemmon || Mount Lemmon Survey || V || align=right | 1.0 km || 
|-id=154 bgcolor=#fefefe
| 263154 ||  || — || November 15, 2007 || Anderson Mesa || LONEOS || — || align=right | 1.1 km || 
|-id=155 bgcolor=#fefefe
| 263155 ||  || — || November 12, 2007 || Catalina || CSS || — || align=right data-sort-value="0.81" | 810 m || 
|-id=156 bgcolor=#fefefe
| 263156 ||  || — || November 13, 2007 || Kitt Peak || Spacewatch || — || align=right data-sort-value="0.47" | 470 m || 
|-id=157 bgcolor=#fefefe
| 263157 ||  || — || November 14, 2007 || Kitt Peak || Spacewatch || FLO || align=right data-sort-value="0.90" | 900 m || 
|-id=158 bgcolor=#E9E9E9
| 263158 ||  || — || November 14, 2007 || Kitt Peak || Spacewatch || RAF || align=right | 1.4 km || 
|-id=159 bgcolor=#E9E9E9
| 263159 ||  || — || November 15, 2007 || Anderson Mesa || LONEOS || — || align=right | 3.7 km || 
|-id=160 bgcolor=#fefefe
| 263160 ||  || — || November 3, 2007 || Catalina || CSS || H || align=right data-sort-value="0.93" | 930 m || 
|-id=161 bgcolor=#fefefe
| 263161 ||  || — || November 3, 2007 || Mount Lemmon || Mount Lemmon Survey || NYS || align=right data-sort-value="0.64" | 640 m || 
|-id=162 bgcolor=#E9E9E9
| 263162 ||  || — || November 1, 2007 || Kitt Peak || Spacewatch || — || align=right | 1.1 km || 
|-id=163 bgcolor=#E9E9E9
| 263163 ||  || — || November 2, 2007 || Mount Lemmon || Mount Lemmon Survey || — || align=right | 1.2 km || 
|-id=164 bgcolor=#E9E9E9
| 263164 ||  || — || November 4, 2007 || Mount Lemmon || Mount Lemmon Survey || AGN || align=right | 1.7 km || 
|-id=165 bgcolor=#fefefe
| 263165 ||  || — || November 11, 2007 || Mount Lemmon || Mount Lemmon Survey || FLO || align=right data-sort-value="0.87" | 870 m || 
|-id=166 bgcolor=#E9E9E9
| 263166 ||  || — || November 12, 2007 || Mount Lemmon || Mount Lemmon Survey || HOF || align=right | 3.6 km || 
|-id=167 bgcolor=#d6d6d6
| 263167 ||  || — || November 11, 2007 || Mount Lemmon || Mount Lemmon Survey || — || align=right | 4.0 km || 
|-id=168 bgcolor=#fefefe
| 263168 ||  || — || November 13, 2007 || Mount Lemmon || Mount Lemmon Survey || NYS || align=right data-sort-value="0.67" | 670 m || 
|-id=169 bgcolor=#E9E9E9
| 263169 ||  || — || November 18, 2007 || Mount Lemmon || Mount Lemmon Survey || — || align=right | 3.5 km || 
|-id=170 bgcolor=#d6d6d6
| 263170 ||  || — || November 18, 2007 || Mount Lemmon || Mount Lemmon Survey || — || align=right | 3.5 km || 
|-id=171 bgcolor=#fefefe
| 263171 ||  || — || November 18, 2007 || Mount Lemmon || Mount Lemmon Survey || — || align=right | 1.0 km || 
|-id=172 bgcolor=#fefefe
| 263172 ||  || — || November 20, 2007 || Mount Lemmon || Mount Lemmon Survey || KLI || align=right | 2.3 km || 
|-id=173 bgcolor=#fefefe
| 263173 ||  || — || November 18, 2007 || Mount Lemmon || Mount Lemmon Survey || — || align=right data-sort-value="0.91" | 910 m || 
|-id=174 bgcolor=#fefefe
| 263174 || 2007 XA || — || December 1, 2007 || Bisei SG Center || BATTeRS || FLO || align=right | 1.0 km || 
|-id=175 bgcolor=#E9E9E9
| 263175 ||  || — || December 3, 2007 || Catalina || CSS || — || align=right | 1.4 km || 
|-id=176 bgcolor=#fefefe
| 263176 ||  || — || December 3, 2007 || Kitt Peak || Spacewatch || NYS || align=right data-sort-value="0.73" | 730 m || 
|-id=177 bgcolor=#fefefe
| 263177 ||  || — || December 15, 2007 || Dauban || Chante-Perdrix Obs. || — || align=right | 1.1 km || 
|-id=178 bgcolor=#fefefe
| 263178 ||  || — || December 15, 2007 || Catalina || CSS || — || align=right data-sort-value="0.71" | 710 m || 
|-id=179 bgcolor=#fefefe
| 263179 ||  || — || December 10, 2007 || Socorro || LINEAR || — || align=right data-sort-value="0.80" | 800 m || 
|-id=180 bgcolor=#fefefe
| 263180 ||  || — || December 13, 2007 || Socorro || LINEAR || — || align=right | 1.2 km || 
|-id=181 bgcolor=#E9E9E9
| 263181 ||  || — || December 5, 2007 || Kitt Peak || Spacewatch || AGN || align=right | 1.4 km || 
|-id=182 bgcolor=#E9E9E9
| 263182 ||  || — || December 5, 2007 || Kitt Peak || Spacewatch || ADE || align=right | 3.3 km || 
|-id=183 bgcolor=#fefefe
| 263183 ||  || — || December 5, 2007 || Kitt Peak || Spacewatch || V || align=right data-sort-value="0.79" | 790 m || 
|-id=184 bgcolor=#E9E9E9
| 263184 ||  || — || December 16, 2007 || Great Shefford || P. Birtwhistle || — || align=right | 1.4 km || 
|-id=185 bgcolor=#fefefe
| 263185 ||  || — || December 17, 2007 || Mount Lemmon || Mount Lemmon Survey || — || align=right | 1.1 km || 
|-id=186 bgcolor=#fefefe
| 263186 ||  || — || December 17, 2007 || Mount Lemmon || Mount Lemmon Survey || — || align=right | 1.1 km || 
|-id=187 bgcolor=#fefefe
| 263187 ||  || — || December 16, 2007 || Mount Lemmon || Mount Lemmon Survey || NYS || align=right data-sort-value="0.82" | 820 m || 
|-id=188 bgcolor=#fefefe
| 263188 ||  || — || December 28, 2007 || Kitt Peak || Spacewatch || V || align=right data-sort-value="0.94" | 940 m || 
|-id=189 bgcolor=#fefefe
| 263189 ||  || — || December 30, 2007 || Mount Lemmon || Mount Lemmon Survey || FLO || align=right data-sort-value="0.72" | 720 m || 
|-id=190 bgcolor=#d6d6d6
| 263190 ||  || — || December 30, 2007 || Kitt Peak || Spacewatch || — || align=right | 3.8 km || 
|-id=191 bgcolor=#fefefe
| 263191 ||  || — || December 30, 2007 || Catalina || CSS || NYS || align=right data-sort-value="0.85" | 850 m || 
|-id=192 bgcolor=#fefefe
| 263192 ||  || — || December 30, 2007 || Kitt Peak || Spacewatch || — || align=right | 1.2 km || 
|-id=193 bgcolor=#d6d6d6
| 263193 ||  || — || December 30, 2007 || Kitt Peak || Spacewatch || — || align=right | 3.9 km || 
|-id=194 bgcolor=#fefefe
| 263194 ||  || — || December 28, 2007 || Kitt Peak || Spacewatch || V || align=right data-sort-value="0.77" | 770 m || 
|-id=195 bgcolor=#E9E9E9
| 263195 ||  || — || December 28, 2007 || Kitt Peak || Spacewatch || — || align=right | 1.8 km || 
|-id=196 bgcolor=#fefefe
| 263196 ||  || — || December 31, 2007 || Kitt Peak || Spacewatch || — || align=right | 1.0 km || 
|-id=197 bgcolor=#E9E9E9
| 263197 ||  || — || December 30, 2007 || Kitt Peak || Spacewatch || — || align=right | 2.1 km || 
|-id=198 bgcolor=#fefefe
| 263198 ||  || — || December 31, 2007 || Catalina || CSS || — || align=right | 1.4 km || 
|-id=199 bgcolor=#fefefe
| 263199 ||  || — || December 30, 2007 || Kitt Peak || Spacewatch || MAS || align=right data-sort-value="0.97" | 970 m || 
|-id=200 bgcolor=#d6d6d6
| 263200 ||  || — || January 1, 2008 || Kitt Peak || Spacewatch || — || align=right | 5.0 km || 
|}

263201–263300 

|-bgcolor=#fefefe
| 263201 ||  || — || January 8, 2008 || Dauban || F. Kugel || — || align=right | 1.2 km || 
|-id=202 bgcolor=#d6d6d6
| 263202 ||  || — || January 9, 2008 || Jarnac || Jarnac Obs. || — || align=right | 3.3 km || 
|-id=203 bgcolor=#E9E9E9
| 263203 ||  || — || January 5, 2008 || Mayhill || A. Lowe || HNS || align=right | 2.1 km || 
|-id=204 bgcolor=#fefefe
| 263204 ||  || — || January 10, 2008 || Mount Lemmon || Mount Lemmon Survey || — || align=right | 1.1 km || 
|-id=205 bgcolor=#d6d6d6
| 263205 ||  || — || January 10, 2008 || Kitt Peak || Spacewatch || — || align=right | 3.0 km || 
|-id=206 bgcolor=#d6d6d6
| 263206 ||  || — || January 10, 2008 || Mount Lemmon || Mount Lemmon Survey || — || align=right | 4.0 km || 
|-id=207 bgcolor=#fefefe
| 263207 ||  || — || January 10, 2008 || Mount Lemmon || Mount Lemmon Survey || — || align=right data-sort-value="0.79" | 790 m || 
|-id=208 bgcolor=#fefefe
| 263208 ||  || — || January 10, 2008 || Mount Lemmon || Mount Lemmon Survey || NYS || align=right data-sort-value="0.59" | 590 m || 
|-id=209 bgcolor=#fefefe
| 263209 ||  || — || January 10, 2008 || Mount Lemmon || Mount Lemmon Survey || NYS || align=right data-sort-value="0.94" | 940 m || 
|-id=210 bgcolor=#E9E9E9
| 263210 ||  || — || January 10, 2008 || Catalina || CSS || — || align=right | 1.9 km || 
|-id=211 bgcolor=#d6d6d6
| 263211 ||  || — || January 10, 2008 || Catalina || CSS || — || align=right | 3.7 km || 
|-id=212 bgcolor=#fefefe
| 263212 ||  || — || January 10, 2008 || Mount Lemmon || Mount Lemmon Survey || MAS || align=right data-sort-value="0.82" | 820 m || 
|-id=213 bgcolor=#fefefe
| 263213 ||  || — || January 10, 2008 || Mount Lemmon || Mount Lemmon Survey || MAS || align=right data-sort-value="0.95" | 950 m || 
|-id=214 bgcolor=#fefefe
| 263214 ||  || — || January 11, 2008 || Desert Eagle || W. K. Y. Yeung || V || align=right data-sort-value="0.78" | 780 m || 
|-id=215 bgcolor=#E9E9E9
| 263215 ||  || — || January 11, 2008 || Kitt Peak || Spacewatch || — || align=right | 1.2 km || 
|-id=216 bgcolor=#E9E9E9
| 263216 ||  || — || January 10, 2008 || Kitt Peak || Spacewatch || — || align=right | 3.6 km || 
|-id=217 bgcolor=#E9E9E9
| 263217 ||  || — || January 10, 2008 || Kitt Peak || Spacewatch || MRX || align=right | 1.5 km || 
|-id=218 bgcolor=#fefefe
| 263218 ||  || — || January 10, 2008 || Catalina || CSS || — || align=right data-sort-value="0.84" | 840 m || 
|-id=219 bgcolor=#d6d6d6
| 263219 ||  || — || January 10, 2008 || Kitt Peak || Spacewatch || — || align=right | 3.9 km || 
|-id=220 bgcolor=#fefefe
| 263220 ||  || — || January 10, 2008 || Mount Lemmon || Mount Lemmon Survey || — || align=right data-sort-value="0.95" | 950 m || 
|-id=221 bgcolor=#fefefe
| 263221 ||  || — || January 10, 2008 || Kitt Peak || Spacewatch || V || align=right | 1.0 km || 
|-id=222 bgcolor=#E9E9E9
| 263222 ||  || — || January 10, 2008 || Catalina || CSS || — || align=right | 2.2 km || 
|-id=223 bgcolor=#E9E9E9
| 263223 ||  || — || January 10, 2008 || Lulin Observatory || LUSS || — || align=right | 3.5 km || 
|-id=224 bgcolor=#E9E9E9
| 263224 ||  || — || January 11, 2008 || Kitt Peak || Spacewatch || — || align=right | 2.8 km || 
|-id=225 bgcolor=#E9E9E9
| 263225 ||  || — || January 11, 2008 || Kitt Peak || Spacewatch || — || align=right | 2.6 km || 
|-id=226 bgcolor=#fefefe
| 263226 ||  || — || January 11, 2008 || Kitt Peak || Spacewatch || NYS || align=right data-sort-value="0.63" | 630 m || 
|-id=227 bgcolor=#fefefe
| 263227 ||  || — || January 11, 2008 || Kitt Peak || Spacewatch || — || align=right data-sort-value="0.82" | 820 m || 
|-id=228 bgcolor=#E9E9E9
| 263228 ||  || — || January 11, 2008 || Kitt Peak || Spacewatch || AER || align=right | 1.8 km || 
|-id=229 bgcolor=#d6d6d6
| 263229 ||  || — || January 11, 2008 || Mount Lemmon || Mount Lemmon Survey || HYG || align=right | 3.6 km || 
|-id=230 bgcolor=#fefefe
| 263230 ||  || — || January 11, 2008 || Kitt Peak || Spacewatch || — || align=right data-sort-value="0.93" | 930 m || 
|-id=231 bgcolor=#E9E9E9
| 263231 ||  || — || January 11, 2008 || Kitt Peak || Spacewatch || — || align=right | 1.6 km || 
|-id=232 bgcolor=#E9E9E9
| 263232 ||  || — || January 11, 2008 || Kitt Peak || Spacewatch || — || align=right | 3.9 km || 
|-id=233 bgcolor=#fefefe
| 263233 ||  || — || January 11, 2008 || Kitt Peak || Spacewatch || — || align=right data-sort-value="0.77" | 770 m || 
|-id=234 bgcolor=#fefefe
| 263234 ||  || — || January 11, 2008 || Kitt Peak || Spacewatch || — || align=right | 1.0 km || 
|-id=235 bgcolor=#fefefe
| 263235 ||  || — || January 11, 2008 || Kitt Peak || Spacewatch || — || align=right data-sort-value="0.91" | 910 m || 
|-id=236 bgcolor=#d6d6d6
| 263236 ||  || — || January 12, 2008 || Kitt Peak || Spacewatch || — || align=right | 3.4 km || 
|-id=237 bgcolor=#E9E9E9
| 263237 ||  || — || January 12, 2008 || Kitt Peak || Spacewatch || HEN || align=right | 1.2 km || 
|-id=238 bgcolor=#fefefe
| 263238 ||  || — || January 12, 2008 || Kitt Peak || Spacewatch || NYS || align=right data-sort-value="0.73" | 730 m || 
|-id=239 bgcolor=#d6d6d6
| 263239 ||  || — || January 15, 2008 || Mount Lemmon || Mount Lemmon Survey || — || align=right | 2.9 km || 
|-id=240 bgcolor=#fefefe
| 263240 ||  || — || January 14, 2008 || Kitt Peak || Spacewatch || — || align=right data-sort-value="0.93" | 930 m || 
|-id=241 bgcolor=#E9E9E9
| 263241 ||  || — || January 13, 2008 || Kitt Peak || Spacewatch || — || align=right | 2.5 km || 
|-id=242 bgcolor=#fefefe
| 263242 ||  || — || January 15, 2008 || Mount Lemmon || Mount Lemmon Survey || — || align=right data-sort-value="0.92" | 920 m || 
|-id=243 bgcolor=#d6d6d6
| 263243 ||  || — || January 15, 2008 || Kitt Peak || Spacewatch || — || align=right | 3.1 km || 
|-id=244 bgcolor=#fefefe
| 263244 ||  || — || January 15, 2008 || Kitt Peak || Spacewatch || — || align=right data-sort-value="0.94" | 940 m || 
|-id=245 bgcolor=#fefefe
| 263245 ||  || — || January 15, 2008 || Kitt Peak || Spacewatch || FLO || align=right data-sort-value="0.86" | 860 m || 
|-id=246 bgcolor=#fefefe
| 263246 ||  || — || January 3, 2008 || Lulin || LUSS || — || align=right | 1.1 km || 
|-id=247 bgcolor=#E9E9E9
| 263247 ||  || — || January 10, 2008 || Mount Lemmon || Mount Lemmon Survey || — || align=right | 1.2 km || 
|-id=248 bgcolor=#E9E9E9
| 263248 ||  || — || January 10, 2008 || Mount Lemmon || Mount Lemmon Survey || — || align=right | 1.9 km || 
|-id=249 bgcolor=#d6d6d6
| 263249 ||  || — || January 11, 2008 || Mount Lemmon || Mount Lemmon Survey || EUP || align=right | 5.3 km || 
|-id=250 bgcolor=#E9E9E9
| 263250 ||  || — || January 11, 2008 || Kitt Peak || Spacewatch || HOF || align=right | 3.1 km || 
|-id=251 bgcolor=#fefefe
| 263251 Pandabear ||  ||  || January 6, 2008 || Mauna Kea || P. A. Wiegert, A. Papadimos || — || align=right data-sort-value="0.94" | 940 m || 
|-id=252 bgcolor=#E9E9E9
| 263252 ||  || — || January 19, 2008 || Pla D'Arguines || R. Ferrando || — || align=right | 2.2 km || 
|-id=253 bgcolor=#fefefe
| 263253 ||  || — || January 16, 2008 || Kitt Peak || Spacewatch || FLO || align=right data-sort-value="0.76" | 760 m || 
|-id=254 bgcolor=#E9E9E9
| 263254 ||  || — || January 19, 2008 || Mount Lemmon || Mount Lemmon Survey || — || align=right | 1.3 km || 
|-id=255 bgcolor=#E9E9E9
| 263255 Jultayu ||  ||  || January 25, 2008 || La Cañada || J. Lacruz || — || align=right | 2.0 km || 
|-id=256 bgcolor=#fefefe
| 263256 ||  || — || January 27, 2008 || Eskridge || G. Hug || V || align=right data-sort-value="0.84" | 840 m || 
|-id=257 bgcolor=#fefefe
| 263257 ||  || — || January 28, 2008 || Lulin || LUSS || MAS || align=right data-sort-value="0.96" | 960 m || 
|-id=258 bgcolor=#E9E9E9
| 263258 ||  || — || January 28, 2008 || Lulin || LUSS || — || align=right | 3.4 km || 
|-id=259 bgcolor=#E9E9E9
| 263259 ||  || — || January 30, 2008 || Catalina || CSS || EUN || align=right | 1.6 km || 
|-id=260 bgcolor=#fefefe
| 263260 ||  || — || January 30, 2008 || Catalina || CSS || NYS || align=right data-sort-value="0.65" | 650 m || 
|-id=261 bgcolor=#E9E9E9
| 263261 ||  || — || January 30, 2008 || Kitt Peak || Spacewatch || — || align=right | 1.6 km || 
|-id=262 bgcolor=#E9E9E9
| 263262 ||  || — || January 30, 2008 || Kitt Peak || Spacewatch || WIT || align=right | 1.6 km || 
|-id=263 bgcolor=#fefefe
| 263263 ||  || — || January 30, 2008 || Mount Lemmon || Mount Lemmon Survey || — || align=right data-sort-value="0.93" | 930 m || 
|-id=264 bgcolor=#d6d6d6
| 263264 ||  || — || January 31, 2008 || Mount Lemmon || Mount Lemmon Survey || — || align=right | 4.3 km || 
|-id=265 bgcolor=#fefefe
| 263265 ||  || — || January 31, 2008 || Mount Lemmon || Mount Lemmon Survey || — || align=right | 1.4 km || 
|-id=266 bgcolor=#E9E9E9
| 263266 ||  || — || January 31, 2008 || Mount Lemmon || Mount Lemmon Survey || — || align=right | 1.9 km || 
|-id=267 bgcolor=#d6d6d6
| 263267 ||  || — || January 30, 2008 || Kitt Peak || Spacewatch || — || align=right | 3.4 km || 
|-id=268 bgcolor=#fefefe
| 263268 ||  || — || January 28, 2008 || Lulin || LUSS || — || align=right | 1.1 km || 
|-id=269 bgcolor=#d6d6d6
| 263269 ||  || — || January 30, 2008 || Mount Lemmon || Mount Lemmon Survey || — || align=right | 3.0 km || 
|-id=270 bgcolor=#fefefe
| 263270 ||  || — || January 30, 2008 || Mount Lemmon || Mount Lemmon Survey || — || align=right data-sort-value="0.91" | 910 m || 
|-id=271 bgcolor=#fefefe
| 263271 ||  || — || January 30, 2008 || Catalina || CSS || — || align=right data-sort-value="0.98" | 980 m || 
|-id=272 bgcolor=#E9E9E9
| 263272 ||  || — || January 30, 2008 || Catalina || CSS || EUN || align=right | 1.5 km || 
|-id=273 bgcolor=#fefefe
| 263273 ||  || — || January 30, 2008 || Catalina || CSS || FLO || align=right data-sort-value="0.73" | 730 m || 
|-id=274 bgcolor=#fefefe
| 263274 ||  || — || January 30, 2008 || Mount Lemmon || Mount Lemmon Survey || NYS || align=right data-sort-value="0.75" | 750 m || 
|-id=275 bgcolor=#fefefe
| 263275 ||  || — || January 30, 2008 || Mount Lemmon || Mount Lemmon Survey || MAS || align=right data-sort-value="0.97" | 970 m || 
|-id=276 bgcolor=#E9E9E9
| 263276 ||  || — || January 30, 2008 || Mount Lemmon || Mount Lemmon Survey || — || align=right | 2.2 km || 
|-id=277 bgcolor=#fefefe
| 263277 ||  || — || January 30, 2008 || Kitt Peak || Spacewatch || MAS || align=right data-sort-value="0.85" | 850 m || 
|-id=278 bgcolor=#E9E9E9
| 263278 ||  || — || January 30, 2008 || Kitt Peak || Spacewatch || NEM || align=right | 2.3 km || 
|-id=279 bgcolor=#d6d6d6
| 263279 ||  || — || January 30, 2008 || Kitt Peak || Spacewatch || — || align=right | 3.3 km || 
|-id=280 bgcolor=#fefefe
| 263280 ||  || — || January 30, 2008 || Kitt Peak || Spacewatch || — || align=right | 1.1 km || 
|-id=281 bgcolor=#fefefe
| 263281 ||  || — || January 30, 2008 || Kitt Peak || Spacewatch || NYS || align=right data-sort-value="0.69" | 690 m || 
|-id=282 bgcolor=#E9E9E9
| 263282 ||  || — || January 30, 2008 || Kitt Peak || Spacewatch || DOR || align=right | 4.1 km || 
|-id=283 bgcolor=#fefefe
| 263283 ||  || — || January 30, 2008 || Kitt Peak || Spacewatch || — || align=right data-sort-value="0.68" | 680 m || 
|-id=284 bgcolor=#fefefe
| 263284 ||  || — || January 31, 2008 || Catalina || CSS || — || align=right data-sort-value="0.89" | 890 m || 
|-id=285 bgcolor=#E9E9E9
| 263285 ||  || — || January 31, 2008 || Mount Lemmon || Mount Lemmon Survey || HEN || align=right data-sort-value="0.97" | 970 m || 
|-id=286 bgcolor=#fefefe
| 263286 ||  || — || January 30, 2008 || Catalina || CSS || — || align=right data-sort-value="0.90" | 900 m || 
|-id=287 bgcolor=#fefefe
| 263287 ||  || — || January 31, 2008 || Catalina || CSS || FLO || align=right | 1.0 km || 
|-id=288 bgcolor=#E9E9E9
| 263288 ||  || — || January 31, 2008 || Mount Lemmon || Mount Lemmon Survey || — || align=right | 2.5 km || 
|-id=289 bgcolor=#d6d6d6
| 263289 ||  || — || January 30, 2008 || Mount Lemmon || Mount Lemmon Survey || — || align=right | 3.1 km || 
|-id=290 bgcolor=#d6d6d6
| 263290 ||  || — || January 19, 2008 || Kitt Peak || Spacewatch || — || align=right | 2.8 km || 
|-id=291 bgcolor=#E9E9E9
| 263291 ||  || — || February 2, 2008 || Mount Lemmon || Mount Lemmon Survey || — || align=right | 2.2 km || 
|-id=292 bgcolor=#fefefe
| 263292 ||  || — || February 2, 2008 || Mount Lemmon || Mount Lemmon Survey || — || align=right | 1.2 km || 
|-id=293 bgcolor=#d6d6d6
| 263293 ||  || — || February 2, 2008 || Mount Lemmon || Mount Lemmon Survey || EOS || align=right | 2.7 km || 
|-id=294 bgcolor=#fefefe
| 263294 ||  || — || February 6, 2008 || Socorro || LINEAR || — || align=right | 1.1 km || 
|-id=295 bgcolor=#fefefe
| 263295 ||  || — || February 2, 2008 || Kitt Peak || Spacewatch || MAS || align=right data-sort-value="0.74" | 740 m || 
|-id=296 bgcolor=#E9E9E9
| 263296 ||  || — || February 3, 2008 || Kitt Peak || Spacewatch || — || align=right | 3.5 km || 
|-id=297 bgcolor=#fefefe
| 263297 ||  || — || February 3, 2008 || Kitt Peak || Spacewatch || NYS || align=right data-sort-value="0.83" | 830 m || 
|-id=298 bgcolor=#d6d6d6
| 263298 ||  || — || February 3, 2008 || Kitt Peak || Spacewatch || CHA || align=right | 2.5 km || 
|-id=299 bgcolor=#E9E9E9
| 263299 ||  || — || February 3, 2008 || Kitt Peak || Spacewatch || — || align=right | 1.6 km || 
|-id=300 bgcolor=#E9E9E9
| 263300 ||  || — || February 3, 2008 || Kitt Peak || Spacewatch || XIZ || align=right | 1.6 km || 
|}

263301–263400 

|-bgcolor=#E9E9E9
| 263301 ||  || — || February 3, 2008 || Kitt Peak || Spacewatch || — || align=right | 1.0 km || 
|-id=302 bgcolor=#d6d6d6
| 263302 ||  || — || February 3, 2008 || Kitt Peak || Spacewatch || — || align=right | 3.2 km || 
|-id=303 bgcolor=#d6d6d6
| 263303 ||  || — || February 3, 2008 || Kitt Peak || Spacewatch || KOR || align=right | 2.1 km || 
|-id=304 bgcolor=#d6d6d6
| 263304 ||  || — || February 6, 2008 || Catalina || CSS || — || align=right | 4.5 km || 
|-id=305 bgcolor=#fefefe
| 263305 ||  || — || February 1, 2008 || Kitt Peak || Spacewatch || MAS || align=right data-sort-value="0.91" | 910 m || 
|-id=306 bgcolor=#E9E9E9
| 263306 ||  || — || February 1, 2008 || Kitt Peak || Spacewatch || — || align=right | 1.1 km || 
|-id=307 bgcolor=#fefefe
| 263307 ||  || — || February 1, 2008 || Kitt Peak || Spacewatch || NYS || align=right data-sort-value="0.77" | 770 m || 
|-id=308 bgcolor=#fefefe
| 263308 ||  || — || February 1, 2008 || Kitt Peak || Spacewatch || NYS || align=right data-sort-value="0.92" | 920 m || 
|-id=309 bgcolor=#fefefe
| 263309 ||  || — || February 2, 2008 || Kitt Peak || Spacewatch || — || align=right data-sort-value="0.95" | 950 m || 
|-id=310 bgcolor=#fefefe
| 263310 ||  || — || February 2, 2008 || Kitt Peak || Spacewatch || NYS || align=right data-sort-value="0.76" | 760 m || 
|-id=311 bgcolor=#E9E9E9
| 263311 ||  || — || February 2, 2008 || Kitt Peak || Spacewatch || — || align=right | 1.1 km || 
|-id=312 bgcolor=#E9E9E9
| 263312 ||  || — || February 2, 2008 || Kitt Peak || Spacewatch || — || align=right | 1.7 km || 
|-id=313 bgcolor=#E9E9E9
| 263313 ||  || — || February 2, 2008 || Kitt Peak || Spacewatch || AGN || align=right | 1.3 km || 
|-id=314 bgcolor=#E9E9E9
| 263314 ||  || — || February 2, 2008 || Mount Lemmon || Mount Lemmon Survey || — || align=right data-sort-value="0.90" | 900 m || 
|-id=315 bgcolor=#fefefe
| 263315 ||  || — || February 2, 2008 || Mount Lemmon || Mount Lemmon Survey || — || align=right data-sort-value="0.85" | 850 m || 
|-id=316 bgcolor=#fefefe
| 263316 ||  || — || February 2, 2008 || Mount Lemmon || Mount Lemmon Survey || MAS || align=right data-sort-value="0.76" | 760 m || 
|-id=317 bgcolor=#d6d6d6
| 263317 ||  || — || February 2, 2008 || Kitt Peak || Spacewatch || — || align=right | 3.0 km || 
|-id=318 bgcolor=#E9E9E9
| 263318 ||  || — || February 2, 2008 || Kitt Peak || Spacewatch || — || align=right | 1.6 km || 
|-id=319 bgcolor=#d6d6d6
| 263319 ||  || — || February 2, 2008 || Kitt Peak || Spacewatch || — || align=right | 2.8 km || 
|-id=320 bgcolor=#d6d6d6
| 263320 ||  || — || February 2, 2008 || Kitt Peak || Spacewatch || 615 || align=right | 1.9 km || 
|-id=321 bgcolor=#E9E9E9
| 263321 ||  || — || February 2, 2008 || Catalina || CSS || — || align=right | 2.2 km || 
|-id=322 bgcolor=#d6d6d6
| 263322 ||  || — || February 3, 2008 || Kitt Peak || Spacewatch || EUP || align=right | 5.4 km || 
|-id=323 bgcolor=#E9E9E9
| 263323 ||  || — || February 6, 2008 || Kitt Peak || Spacewatch || — || align=right | 1.1 km || 
|-id=324 bgcolor=#fefefe
| 263324 ||  || — || February 6, 2008 || Catalina || CSS || V || align=right | 1.2 km || 
|-id=325 bgcolor=#E9E9E9
| 263325 ||  || — || February 7, 2008 || Kitt Peak || Spacewatch || — || align=right | 4.0 km || 
|-id=326 bgcolor=#E9E9E9
| 263326 ||  || — || February 7, 2008 || Kitt Peak || Spacewatch || HOF || align=right | 3.2 km || 
|-id=327 bgcolor=#E9E9E9
| 263327 ||  || — || February 7, 2008 || Kitt Peak || Spacewatch || — || align=right | 1.2 km || 
|-id=328 bgcolor=#fefefe
| 263328 ||  || — || February 7, 2008 || Kitt Peak || Spacewatch || — || align=right | 1.0 km || 
|-id=329 bgcolor=#E9E9E9
| 263329 ||  || — || February 8, 2008 || Mount Lemmon || Mount Lemmon Survey || — || align=right | 1.7 km || 
|-id=330 bgcolor=#E9E9E9
| 263330 ||  || — || February 8, 2008 || Mount Lemmon || Mount Lemmon Survey || — || align=right | 2.6 km || 
|-id=331 bgcolor=#fefefe
| 263331 ||  || — || February 9, 2008 || Socorro || LINEAR || — || align=right | 1.1 km || 
|-id=332 bgcolor=#d6d6d6
| 263332 ||  || — || February 6, 2008 || Catalina || CSS || LIX || align=right | 6.2 km || 
|-id=333 bgcolor=#d6d6d6
| 263333 ||  || — || February 8, 2008 || Kitt Peak || Spacewatch || — || align=right | 4.6 km || 
|-id=334 bgcolor=#fefefe
| 263334 ||  || — || February 6, 2008 || Catalina || CSS || — || align=right | 1.2 km || 
|-id=335 bgcolor=#d6d6d6
| 263335 ||  || — || February 6, 2008 || Kitt Peak || Spacewatch || — || align=right | 3.2 km || 
|-id=336 bgcolor=#fefefe
| 263336 ||  || — || February 7, 2008 || Kitt Peak || Spacewatch || — || align=right | 1.1 km || 
|-id=337 bgcolor=#fefefe
| 263337 ||  || — || February 7, 2008 || Kitt Peak || Spacewatch || — || align=right data-sort-value="0.79" | 790 m || 
|-id=338 bgcolor=#fefefe
| 263338 ||  || — || February 7, 2008 || Mount Lemmon || Mount Lemmon Survey || NYS || align=right data-sort-value="0.77" | 770 m || 
|-id=339 bgcolor=#fefefe
| 263339 ||  || — || February 7, 2008 || Mount Lemmon || Mount Lemmon Survey || NYS || align=right data-sort-value="0.93" | 930 m || 
|-id=340 bgcolor=#fefefe
| 263340 ||  || — || February 7, 2008 || Mount Lemmon || Mount Lemmon Survey || FLO || align=right data-sort-value="0.67" | 670 m || 
|-id=341 bgcolor=#d6d6d6
| 263341 ||  || — || February 7, 2008 || Kitt Peak || Spacewatch || EOS || align=right | 2.4 km || 
|-id=342 bgcolor=#d6d6d6
| 263342 ||  || — || February 8, 2008 || Kitt Peak || Spacewatch || — || align=right | 3.9 km || 
|-id=343 bgcolor=#E9E9E9
| 263343 ||  || — || February 9, 2008 || Kitt Peak || Spacewatch || — || align=right | 3.1 km || 
|-id=344 bgcolor=#fefefe
| 263344 ||  || — || February 9, 2008 || Kitt Peak || Spacewatch || — || align=right data-sort-value="0.84" | 840 m || 
|-id=345 bgcolor=#fefefe
| 263345 ||  || — || February 9, 2008 || Catalina || CSS || — || align=right | 1.0 km || 
|-id=346 bgcolor=#fefefe
| 263346 ||  || — || February 9, 2008 || Kitt Peak || Spacewatch || FLO || align=right data-sort-value="0.78" | 780 m || 
|-id=347 bgcolor=#E9E9E9
| 263347 ||  || — || February 10, 2008 || Kitt Peak || Spacewatch || WIT || align=right | 1.6 km || 
|-id=348 bgcolor=#E9E9E9
| 263348 ||  || — || February 10, 2008 || Mount Lemmon || Mount Lemmon Survey || WIT || align=right | 1.5 km || 
|-id=349 bgcolor=#fefefe
| 263349 ||  || — || February 11, 2008 || Andrushivka || Andrushivka Obs. || NYS || align=right data-sort-value="0.90" | 900 m || 
|-id=350 bgcolor=#d6d6d6
| 263350 ||  || — || February 7, 2008 || Kitt Peak || Spacewatch || EOS || align=right | 2.2 km || 
|-id=351 bgcolor=#fefefe
| 263351 ||  || — || February 8, 2008 || Kitt Peak || Spacewatch || NYS || align=right data-sort-value="0.79" | 790 m || 
|-id=352 bgcolor=#fefefe
| 263352 ||  || — || February 8, 2008 || Kitt Peak || Spacewatch || — || align=right | 1.2 km || 
|-id=353 bgcolor=#E9E9E9
| 263353 ||  || — || February 8, 2008 || Kitt Peak || Spacewatch || — || align=right data-sort-value="0.95" | 950 m || 
|-id=354 bgcolor=#d6d6d6
| 263354 ||  || — || February 8, 2008 || Kitt Peak || Spacewatch || EOS || align=right | 3.1 km || 
|-id=355 bgcolor=#E9E9E9
| 263355 ||  || — || February 8, 2008 || Kitt Peak || Spacewatch || — || align=right | 1.1 km || 
|-id=356 bgcolor=#E9E9E9
| 263356 ||  || — || February 8, 2008 || Kitt Peak || Spacewatch || — || align=right | 2.0 km || 
|-id=357 bgcolor=#E9E9E9
| 263357 ||  || — || February 8, 2008 || Kitt Peak || Spacewatch || HEN || align=right | 1.2 km || 
|-id=358 bgcolor=#fefefe
| 263358 ||  || — || February 8, 2008 || Kitt Peak || Spacewatch || — || align=right data-sort-value="0.85" | 850 m || 
|-id=359 bgcolor=#E9E9E9
| 263359 ||  || — || February 9, 2008 || Kitt Peak || Spacewatch || HEN || align=right | 1.4 km || 
|-id=360 bgcolor=#fefefe
| 263360 ||  || — || February 9, 2008 || Kitt Peak || Spacewatch || — || align=right data-sort-value="0.89" | 890 m || 
|-id=361 bgcolor=#fefefe
| 263361 ||  || — || February 9, 2008 || Catalina || CSS || FLO || align=right data-sort-value="0.68" | 680 m || 
|-id=362 bgcolor=#E9E9E9
| 263362 ||  || — || February 9, 2008 || Mount Lemmon || Mount Lemmon Survey || — || align=right | 2.6 km || 
|-id=363 bgcolor=#fefefe
| 263363 ||  || — || February 9, 2008 || Catalina || CSS || FLO || align=right data-sort-value="0.66" | 660 m || 
|-id=364 bgcolor=#fefefe
| 263364 ||  || — || February 9, 2008 || Catalina || CSS || V || align=right data-sort-value="0.80" | 800 m || 
|-id=365 bgcolor=#fefefe
| 263365 ||  || — || February 9, 2008 || Kitt Peak || Spacewatch || NYS || align=right data-sort-value="0.80" | 800 m || 
|-id=366 bgcolor=#fefefe
| 263366 ||  || — || February 9, 2008 || Kitt Peak || Spacewatch || NYS || align=right data-sort-value="0.52" | 520 m || 
|-id=367 bgcolor=#d6d6d6
| 263367 ||  || — || February 9, 2008 || Catalina || CSS || — || align=right | 4.9 km || 
|-id=368 bgcolor=#E9E9E9
| 263368 ||  || — || February 9, 2008 || Kitt Peak || Spacewatch || — || align=right data-sort-value="0.95" | 950 m || 
|-id=369 bgcolor=#fefefe
| 263369 ||  || — || February 10, 2008 || Catalina || CSS || — || align=right data-sort-value="0.97" | 970 m || 
|-id=370 bgcolor=#E9E9E9
| 263370 ||  || — || February 10, 2008 || Catalina || CSS || — || align=right | 2.9 km || 
|-id=371 bgcolor=#fefefe
| 263371 ||  || — || February 10, 2008 || Kitt Peak || Spacewatch || NYS || align=right data-sort-value="0.73" | 730 m || 
|-id=372 bgcolor=#fefefe
| 263372 ||  || — || February 10, 2008 || Kitt Peak || Spacewatch || NYS || align=right data-sort-value="0.75" | 750 m || 
|-id=373 bgcolor=#fefefe
| 263373 ||  || — || February 11, 2008 || Mount Lemmon || Mount Lemmon Survey || FLO || align=right data-sort-value="0.64" | 640 m || 
|-id=374 bgcolor=#E9E9E9
| 263374 ||  || — || February 13, 2008 || Kitt Peak || Spacewatch || — || align=right | 1.3 km || 
|-id=375 bgcolor=#fefefe
| 263375 ||  || — || February 6, 2008 || Socorro || LINEAR || V || align=right data-sort-value="0.78" | 780 m || 
|-id=376 bgcolor=#d6d6d6
| 263376 ||  || — || February 6, 2008 || Catalina || CSS || — || align=right | 4.3 km || 
|-id=377 bgcolor=#E9E9E9
| 263377 ||  || — || February 9, 2008 || Catalina || CSS || — || align=right | 2.8 km || 
|-id=378 bgcolor=#fefefe
| 263378 ||  || — || February 13, 2008 || Catalina || CSS || V || align=right data-sort-value="0.99" | 990 m || 
|-id=379 bgcolor=#E9E9E9
| 263379 ||  || — || February 13, 2008 || Anderson Mesa || LONEOS || — || align=right | 3.2 km || 
|-id=380 bgcolor=#fefefe
| 263380 ||  || — || February 9, 2008 || Kitt Peak || Spacewatch || V || align=right data-sort-value="0.82" | 820 m || 
|-id=381 bgcolor=#E9E9E9
| 263381 ||  || — || February 3, 2008 || Catalina || CSS || — || align=right | 1.6 km || 
|-id=382 bgcolor=#E9E9E9
| 263382 ||  || — || February 3, 2008 || Catalina || CSS || MAR || align=right | 1.6 km || 
|-id=383 bgcolor=#fefefe
| 263383 ||  || — || February 12, 2008 || Kitt Peak || Spacewatch || NYS || align=right data-sort-value="0.71" | 710 m || 
|-id=384 bgcolor=#E9E9E9
| 263384 ||  || — || February 11, 2008 || Mount Lemmon || Mount Lemmon Survey || — || align=right | 1.5 km || 
|-id=385 bgcolor=#d6d6d6
| 263385 ||  || — || February 11, 2008 || Mount Lemmon || Mount Lemmon Survey || 7:4 || align=right | 4.7 km || 
|-id=386 bgcolor=#fefefe
| 263386 ||  || — || February 13, 2008 || Kitt Peak || Spacewatch || — || align=right data-sort-value="0.98" | 980 m || 
|-id=387 bgcolor=#fefefe
| 263387 ||  || — || February 8, 2008 || Mount Lemmon || Mount Lemmon Survey || — || align=right data-sort-value="0.89" | 890 m || 
|-id=388 bgcolor=#E9E9E9
| 263388 ||  || — || February 1, 2008 || Kitt Peak || Spacewatch || — || align=right | 3.2 km || 
|-id=389 bgcolor=#E9E9E9
| 263389 ||  || — || February 2, 2008 || Kitt Peak || Spacewatch || — || align=right | 2.0 km || 
|-id=390 bgcolor=#fefefe
| 263390 ||  || — || February 13, 2008 || Mount Lemmon || Mount Lemmon Survey || — || align=right data-sort-value="0.73" | 730 m || 
|-id=391 bgcolor=#d6d6d6
| 263391 || 2008 DA || — || February 16, 2008 || Taunus || E. Schwab, R. Kling || EOS || align=right | 2.3 km || 
|-id=392 bgcolor=#fefefe
| 263392 ||  || — || February 24, 2008 || Kitt Peak || Spacewatch || — || align=right data-sort-value="0.78" | 780 m || 
|-id=393 bgcolor=#E9E9E9
| 263393 ||  || — || February 28, 2008 || Bisei SG Center || BATTeRS || — || align=right | 2.6 km || 
|-id=394 bgcolor=#fefefe
| 263394 ||  || — || February 24, 2008 || Kitt Peak || Spacewatch || FLO || align=right data-sort-value="0.72" | 720 m || 
|-id=395 bgcolor=#fefefe
| 263395 ||  || — || February 24, 2008 || Mount Lemmon || Mount Lemmon Survey || NYS || align=right data-sort-value="0.72" | 720 m || 
|-id=396 bgcolor=#d6d6d6
| 263396 ||  || — || February 26, 2008 || Kitt Peak || Spacewatch || — || align=right | 3.3 km || 
|-id=397 bgcolor=#d6d6d6
| 263397 ||  || — || February 26, 2008 || Mount Lemmon || Mount Lemmon Survey || — || align=right | 4.4 km || 
|-id=398 bgcolor=#E9E9E9
| 263398 ||  || — || February 26, 2008 || Mount Lemmon || Mount Lemmon Survey || — || align=right | 1.9 km || 
|-id=399 bgcolor=#d6d6d6
| 263399 ||  || — || February 27, 2008 || Mount Lemmon || Mount Lemmon Survey || — || align=right | 3.5 km || 
|-id=400 bgcolor=#E9E9E9
| 263400 ||  || — || February 27, 2008 || Kitt Peak || Spacewatch || — || align=right | 1.7 km || 
|}

263401–263500 

|-bgcolor=#fefefe
| 263401 ||  || — || February 26, 2008 || Socorro || LINEAR || — || align=right data-sort-value="0.81" | 810 m || 
|-id=402 bgcolor=#E9E9E9
| 263402 ||  || — || February 26, 2008 || Mount Lemmon || Mount Lemmon Survey || ADE || align=right | 3.2 km || 
|-id=403 bgcolor=#fefefe
| 263403 ||  || — || February 27, 2008 || Catalina || CSS || — || align=right | 1.0 km || 
|-id=404 bgcolor=#E9E9E9
| 263404 ||  || — || February 29, 2008 || Purple Mountain || PMO NEO || — || align=right | 1.5 km || 
|-id=405 bgcolor=#fefefe
| 263405 ||  || — || February 29, 2008 || Purple Mountain || PMO NEO || — || align=right | 1.2 km || 
|-id=406 bgcolor=#d6d6d6
| 263406 ||  || — || February 26, 2008 || Kitt Peak || Spacewatch || HYG || align=right | 3.3 km || 
|-id=407 bgcolor=#fefefe
| 263407 ||  || — || February 28, 2008 || Kitt Peak || Spacewatch || — || align=right | 1.1 km || 
|-id=408 bgcolor=#d6d6d6
| 263408 ||  || — || February 28, 2008 || Kitt Peak || Spacewatch || — || align=right | 4.6 km || 
|-id=409 bgcolor=#fefefe
| 263409 ||  || — || February 27, 2008 || Catalina || CSS || — || align=right | 1.3 km || 
|-id=410 bgcolor=#d6d6d6
| 263410 ||  || — || February 27, 2008 || Mount Lemmon || Mount Lemmon Survey || KOR || align=right | 1.8 km || 
|-id=411 bgcolor=#fefefe
| 263411 ||  || — || February 27, 2008 || Mount Lemmon || Mount Lemmon Survey || — || align=right data-sort-value="0.87" | 870 m || 
|-id=412 bgcolor=#E9E9E9
| 263412 ||  || — || February 27, 2008 || Mount Lemmon || Mount Lemmon Survey || — || align=right | 1.00 km || 
|-id=413 bgcolor=#E9E9E9
| 263413 ||  || — || February 27, 2008 || Kitt Peak || Spacewatch || NEM || align=right | 2.6 km || 
|-id=414 bgcolor=#d6d6d6
| 263414 ||  || — || February 28, 2008 || Kitt Peak || Spacewatch || — || align=right | 3.0 km || 
|-id=415 bgcolor=#fefefe
| 263415 ||  || — || February 28, 2008 || Mount Lemmon || Mount Lemmon Survey || NYS || align=right data-sort-value="0.90" | 900 m || 
|-id=416 bgcolor=#E9E9E9
| 263416 ||  || — || February 28, 2008 || Mount Lemmon || Mount Lemmon Survey || JUN || align=right | 1.3 km || 
|-id=417 bgcolor=#fefefe
| 263417 ||  || — || February 28, 2008 || Kitt Peak || Spacewatch || NYS || align=right data-sort-value="0.84" | 840 m || 
|-id=418 bgcolor=#d6d6d6
| 263418 ||  || — || February 28, 2008 || Kitt Peak || Spacewatch || — || align=right | 4.0 km || 
|-id=419 bgcolor=#fefefe
| 263419 ||  || — || February 28, 2008 || Kitt Peak || Spacewatch || NYS || align=right data-sort-value="0.84" | 840 m || 
|-id=420 bgcolor=#E9E9E9
| 263420 ||  || — || February 28, 2008 || Kitt Peak || Spacewatch || — || align=right | 1.7 km || 
|-id=421 bgcolor=#E9E9E9
| 263421 ||  || — || February 29, 2008 || Catalina || CSS || — || align=right | 1.5 km || 
|-id=422 bgcolor=#fefefe
| 263422 ||  || — || February 29, 2008 || Kitt Peak || Spacewatch || NYS || align=right data-sort-value="0.98" | 980 m || 
|-id=423 bgcolor=#d6d6d6
| 263423 ||  || — || February 29, 2008 || Mount Lemmon || Mount Lemmon Survey || SYL7:4 || align=right | 5.6 km || 
|-id=424 bgcolor=#E9E9E9
| 263424 ||  || — || February 28, 2008 || Catalina || CSS || — || align=right | 2.2 km || 
|-id=425 bgcolor=#d6d6d6
| 263425 ||  || — || February 27, 2008 || Catalina || CSS || — || align=right | 3.9 km || 
|-id=426 bgcolor=#E9E9E9
| 263426 ||  || — || February 28, 2008 || Catalina || CSS || JUN || align=right | 1.3 km || 
|-id=427 bgcolor=#E9E9E9
| 263427 ||  || — || February 28, 2008 || Kitt Peak || Spacewatch || XIZ || align=right | 1.9 km || 
|-id=428 bgcolor=#E9E9E9
| 263428 ||  || — || February 29, 2008 || Kitt Peak || Spacewatch || — || align=right | 3.2 km || 
|-id=429 bgcolor=#d6d6d6
| 263429 ||  || — || February 29, 2008 || Kitt Peak || Spacewatch || — || align=right | 3.7 km || 
|-id=430 bgcolor=#E9E9E9
| 263430 ||  || — || February 29, 2008 || Kitt Peak || Spacewatch || — || align=right | 1.6 km || 
|-id=431 bgcolor=#E9E9E9
| 263431 ||  || — || February 29, 2008 || Kitt Peak || Spacewatch || — || align=right data-sort-value="0.97" | 970 m || 
|-id=432 bgcolor=#d6d6d6
| 263432 ||  || — || February 29, 2008 || Kitt Peak || Spacewatch || THM || align=right | 2.8 km || 
|-id=433 bgcolor=#d6d6d6
| 263433 ||  || — || February 29, 2008 || Kitt Peak || Spacewatch || KOR || align=right | 2.1 km || 
|-id=434 bgcolor=#fefefe
| 263434 ||  || — || February 27, 2008 || Catalina || CSS || — || align=right | 1.3 km || 
|-id=435 bgcolor=#d6d6d6
| 263435 ||  || — || February 27, 2008 || Catalina || CSS || — || align=right | 4.4 km || 
|-id=436 bgcolor=#fefefe
| 263436 ||  || — || February 27, 2008 || Mount Lemmon || Mount Lemmon Survey || NYS || align=right data-sort-value="0.84" | 840 m || 
|-id=437 bgcolor=#E9E9E9
| 263437 ||  || — || February 28, 2008 || Mount Lemmon || Mount Lemmon Survey || — || align=right | 1.6 km || 
|-id=438 bgcolor=#E9E9E9
| 263438 ||  || — || February 28, 2008 || Mount Lemmon || Mount Lemmon Survey || — || align=right | 1.1 km || 
|-id=439 bgcolor=#fefefe
| 263439 ||  || — || February 28, 2008 || Purple Mountain || PMO NEO || — || align=right | 1.5 km || 
|-id=440 bgcolor=#E9E9E9
| 263440 ||  || — || February 29, 2008 || Purple Mountain || PMO NEO || — || align=right | 3.8 km || 
|-id=441 bgcolor=#E9E9E9
| 263441 ||  || — || February 29, 2008 || Catalina || CSS || MAR || align=right | 1.4 km || 
|-id=442 bgcolor=#d6d6d6
| 263442 ||  || — || February 28, 2008 || Kitt Peak || Spacewatch || EOS || align=right | 1.9 km || 
|-id=443 bgcolor=#d6d6d6
| 263443 ||  || — || February 26, 2008 || Mount Lemmon || Mount Lemmon Survey || — || align=right | 2.6 km || 
|-id=444 bgcolor=#d6d6d6
| 263444 ||  || — || February 26, 2008 || Kitt Peak || Spacewatch || EOS || align=right | 2.1 km || 
|-id=445 bgcolor=#E9E9E9
| 263445 ||  || — || February 26, 2008 || Kitt Peak || Spacewatch || — || align=right | 2.8 km || 
|-id=446 bgcolor=#E9E9E9
| 263446 ||  || — || February 18, 2008 || Mount Lemmon || Mount Lemmon Survey || — || align=right | 1.4 km || 
|-id=447 bgcolor=#fefefe
| 263447 ||  || — || March 1, 2008 || Kachina || J. Hobart || — || align=right | 1.1 km || 
|-id=448 bgcolor=#fefefe
| 263448 ||  || — || March 3, 2008 || Dauban || F. Kugel || — || align=right | 1.3 km || 
|-id=449 bgcolor=#E9E9E9
| 263449 ||  || — || March 1, 2008 || Kitt Peak || Spacewatch || AGN || align=right | 1.2 km || 
|-id=450 bgcolor=#d6d6d6
| 263450 ||  || — || March 1, 2008 || Mount Lemmon || Mount Lemmon Survey || — || align=right | 3.9 km || 
|-id=451 bgcolor=#fefefe
| 263451 ||  || — || March 2, 2008 || Catalina || CSS || V || align=right data-sort-value="0.87" | 870 m || 
|-id=452 bgcolor=#fefefe
| 263452 ||  || — || March 2, 2008 || Mount Lemmon || Mount Lemmon Survey || V || align=right data-sort-value="0.83" | 830 m || 
|-id=453 bgcolor=#E9E9E9
| 263453 ||  || — || March 4, 2008 || Mayhill || A. Lowe || — || align=right | 2.6 km || 
|-id=454 bgcolor=#E9E9E9
| 263454 ||  || — || March 1, 2008 || Kitt Peak || Spacewatch || MRX || align=right | 1.7 km || 
|-id=455 bgcolor=#d6d6d6
| 263455 ||  || — || March 1, 2008 || Kitt Peak || Spacewatch || — || align=right | 2.3 km || 
|-id=456 bgcolor=#E9E9E9
| 263456 ||  || — || March 1, 2008 || Kitt Peak || Spacewatch || — || align=right | 2.6 km || 
|-id=457 bgcolor=#fefefe
| 263457 ||  || — || March 1, 2008 || Kitt Peak || Spacewatch || MAS || align=right data-sort-value="0.90" | 900 m || 
|-id=458 bgcolor=#E9E9E9
| 263458 ||  || — || March 1, 2008 || Kitt Peak || Spacewatch || — || align=right | 2.4 km || 
|-id=459 bgcolor=#E9E9E9
| 263459 ||  || — || March 2, 2008 || Purple Mountain || PMO NEO || — || align=right | 3.8 km || 
|-id=460 bgcolor=#E9E9E9
| 263460 ||  || — || March 2, 2008 || Purple Mountain || PMO NEO || — || align=right | 3.7 km || 
|-id=461 bgcolor=#E9E9E9
| 263461 ||  || — || March 4, 2008 || Mount Lemmon || Mount Lemmon Survey || — || align=right | 2.5 km || 
|-id=462 bgcolor=#fefefe
| 263462 ||  || — || March 2, 2008 || Kitt Peak || Spacewatch || NYS || align=right data-sort-value="0.68" | 680 m || 
|-id=463 bgcolor=#d6d6d6
| 263463 ||  || — || March 2, 2008 || Catalina || CSS || — || align=right | 6.0 km || 
|-id=464 bgcolor=#E9E9E9
| 263464 ||  || — || March 3, 2008 || Kitt Peak || Spacewatch || — || align=right | 1.9 km || 
|-id=465 bgcolor=#d6d6d6
| 263465 ||  || — || March 4, 2008 || Kitt Peak || Spacewatch || — || align=right | 3.7 km || 
|-id=466 bgcolor=#E9E9E9
| 263466 ||  || — || March 4, 2008 || Mount Lemmon || Mount Lemmon Survey || HEN || align=right | 1.6 km || 
|-id=467 bgcolor=#E9E9E9
| 263467 ||  || — || March 5, 2008 || Kitt Peak || Spacewatch || MRX || align=right | 1.4 km || 
|-id=468 bgcolor=#fefefe
| 263468 ||  || — || March 6, 2008 || Mount Lemmon || Mount Lemmon Survey || V || align=right data-sort-value="0.81" | 810 m || 
|-id=469 bgcolor=#fefefe
| 263469 ||  || — || March 7, 2008 || Mount Lemmon || Mount Lemmon Survey || — || align=right data-sort-value="0.98" | 980 m || 
|-id=470 bgcolor=#fefefe
| 263470 ||  || — || March 8, 2008 || Catalina || CSS || V || align=right data-sort-value="0.76" | 760 m || 
|-id=471 bgcolor=#E9E9E9
| 263471 ||  || — || September 23, 2005 || Catalina || CSS || AGN || align=right | 1.5 km || 
|-id=472 bgcolor=#E9E9E9
| 263472 ||  || — || March 9, 2008 || Mount Lemmon || Mount Lemmon Survey || — || align=right | 1.0 km || 
|-id=473 bgcolor=#E9E9E9
| 263473 ||  || — || March 9, 2008 || Mount Lemmon || Mount Lemmon Survey || — || align=right | 2.1 km || 
|-id=474 bgcolor=#E9E9E9
| 263474 ||  || — || March 6, 2008 || Mount Lemmon || Mount Lemmon Survey || — || align=right | 2.6 km || 
|-id=475 bgcolor=#E9E9E9
| 263475 ||  || — || March 7, 2008 || Catalina || CSS || — || align=right | 2.1 km || 
|-id=476 bgcolor=#fefefe
| 263476 ||  || — || March 7, 2008 || Kitt Peak || Spacewatch || FLO || align=right data-sort-value="0.75" | 750 m || 
|-id=477 bgcolor=#fefefe
| 263477 ||  || — || March 7, 2008 || Kitt Peak || Spacewatch || — || align=right data-sort-value="0.88" | 880 m || 
|-id=478 bgcolor=#E9E9E9
| 263478 ||  || — || March 7, 2008 || Kitt Peak || Spacewatch || — || align=right | 2.8 km || 
|-id=479 bgcolor=#d6d6d6
| 263479 ||  || — || March 7, 2008 || Kitt Peak || Spacewatch || VER || align=right | 4.6 km || 
|-id=480 bgcolor=#fefefe
| 263480 ||  || — || March 8, 2008 || Catalina || CSS || — || align=right | 1.1 km || 
|-id=481 bgcolor=#E9E9E9
| 263481 ||  || — || March 9, 2008 || Kitt Peak || Spacewatch || — || align=right | 1.3 km || 
|-id=482 bgcolor=#E9E9E9
| 263482 ||  || — || March 9, 2008 || Kitt Peak || Spacewatch || — || align=right | 2.6 km || 
|-id=483 bgcolor=#d6d6d6
| 263483 ||  || — || March 8, 2008 || Socorro || LINEAR || — || align=right | 4.9 km || 
|-id=484 bgcolor=#fefefe
| 263484 ||  || — || March 9, 2008 || Socorro || LINEAR || — || align=right | 1.3 km || 
|-id=485 bgcolor=#fefefe
| 263485 ||  || — || March 11, 2008 || Bisei SG Center || BATTeRS || — || align=right | 1.2 km || 
|-id=486 bgcolor=#d6d6d6
| 263486 ||  || — || March 7, 2008 || Kitt Peak || Spacewatch || EOS || align=right | 4.8 km || 
|-id=487 bgcolor=#E9E9E9
| 263487 ||  || — || March 10, 2008 || Mount Lemmon || Mount Lemmon Survey || — || align=right | 2.6 km || 
|-id=488 bgcolor=#d6d6d6
| 263488 ||  || — || March 8, 2008 || Socorro || LINEAR || — || align=right | 5.0 km || 
|-id=489 bgcolor=#fefefe
| 263489 ||  || — || March 8, 2008 || Socorro || LINEAR || — || align=right | 1.0 km || 
|-id=490 bgcolor=#d6d6d6
| 263490 ||  || — || March 3, 2008 || Catalina || CSS || VER || align=right | 3.5 km || 
|-id=491 bgcolor=#E9E9E9
| 263491 ||  || — || March 3, 2008 || Mount Lemmon || Mount Lemmon Survey || — || align=right | 3.0 km || 
|-id=492 bgcolor=#fefefe
| 263492 ||  || — || March 5, 2008 || Mount Lemmon || Mount Lemmon Survey || — || align=right data-sort-value="0.85" | 850 m || 
|-id=493 bgcolor=#E9E9E9
| 263493 ||  || — || March 7, 2008 || Mount Lemmon || Mount Lemmon Survey || — || align=right | 1.7 km || 
|-id=494 bgcolor=#d6d6d6
| 263494 ||  || — || March 3, 2008 || Lulin || LUSS || 7:4 || align=right | 5.0 km || 
|-id=495 bgcolor=#fefefe
| 263495 ||  || — || March 9, 2008 || Kitt Peak || Spacewatch || MAS || align=right data-sort-value="0.97" | 970 m || 
|-id=496 bgcolor=#d6d6d6
| 263496 ||  || — || March 5, 2008 || Kitt Peak || Spacewatch || EOS || align=right | 2.5 km || 
|-id=497 bgcolor=#d6d6d6
| 263497 ||  || — || March 6, 2008 || Mount Lemmon || Mount Lemmon Survey || — || align=right | 3.0 km || 
|-id=498 bgcolor=#d6d6d6
| 263498 ||  || — || March 6, 2008 || Mount Lemmon || Mount Lemmon Survey || — || align=right | 3.2 km || 
|-id=499 bgcolor=#E9E9E9
| 263499 ||  || — || March 8, 2008 || Kitt Peak || Spacewatch || — || align=right | 2.1 km || 
|-id=500 bgcolor=#fefefe
| 263500 ||  || — || March 9, 2008 || Mount Lemmon || Mount Lemmon Survey || — || align=right data-sort-value="0.79" | 790 m || 
|}

263501–263600 

|-bgcolor=#fefefe
| 263501 ||  || — || March 9, 2008 || Kitt Peak || Spacewatch || — || align=right data-sort-value="0.75" | 750 m || 
|-id=502 bgcolor=#d6d6d6
| 263502 ||  || — || March 9, 2008 || Kitt Peak || Spacewatch || HYG || align=right | 3.2 km || 
|-id=503 bgcolor=#fefefe
| 263503 ||  || — || March 9, 2008 || Kitt Peak || Spacewatch || — || align=right | 1.3 km || 
|-id=504 bgcolor=#E9E9E9
| 263504 ||  || — || March 9, 2008 || Kitt Peak || Spacewatch || — || align=right | 2.4 km || 
|-id=505 bgcolor=#E9E9E9
| 263505 ||  || — || March 9, 2008 || Kitt Peak || Spacewatch || MIS || align=right | 2.9 km || 
|-id=506 bgcolor=#E9E9E9
| 263506 ||  || — || March 10, 2008 || Kitt Peak || Spacewatch || HEN || align=right | 1.2 km || 
|-id=507 bgcolor=#E9E9E9
| 263507 ||  || — || March 10, 2008 || Kitt Peak || Spacewatch || — || align=right | 1.6 km || 
|-id=508 bgcolor=#E9E9E9
| 263508 ||  || — || March 10, 2008 || Catalina || CSS || — || align=right | 2.0 km || 
|-id=509 bgcolor=#fefefe
| 263509 ||  || — || March 11, 2008 || Kitt Peak || Spacewatch || — || align=right | 1.1 km || 
|-id=510 bgcolor=#d6d6d6
| 263510 ||  || — || March 11, 2008 || Kitt Peak || Spacewatch || VER || align=right | 3.5 km || 
|-id=511 bgcolor=#fefefe
| 263511 ||  || — || March 11, 2008 || Kitt Peak || Spacewatch || — || align=right data-sort-value="0.80" | 800 m || 
|-id=512 bgcolor=#fefefe
| 263512 ||  || — || March 11, 2008 || Kitt Peak || Spacewatch || — || align=right | 1.0 km || 
|-id=513 bgcolor=#fefefe
| 263513 ||  || — || March 12, 2008 || Mount Lemmon || Mount Lemmon Survey || — || align=right | 1.2 km || 
|-id=514 bgcolor=#d6d6d6
| 263514 ||  || — || March 14, 2008 || Catalina || CSS || LIX || align=right | 6.4 km || 
|-id=515 bgcolor=#d6d6d6
| 263515 ||  || — || March 8, 2008 || Kitt Peak || Spacewatch || — || align=right | 4.0 km || 
|-id=516 bgcolor=#fefefe
| 263516 Alexescu ||  ||  || March 13, 2008 || La Silla || EURONEAR || V || align=right data-sort-value="0.88" | 880 m || 
|-id=517 bgcolor=#d6d6d6
| 263517 ||  || — || March 1, 2008 || Kitt Peak || Spacewatch || THM || align=right | 2.2 km || 
|-id=518 bgcolor=#fefefe
| 263518 ||  || — || March 2, 2008 || Kitt Peak || Spacewatch || — || align=right data-sort-value="0.76" | 760 m || 
|-id=519 bgcolor=#fefefe
| 263519 ||  || — || March 2, 2008 || Purple Mountain || PMO NEO || — || align=right | 1.1 km || 
|-id=520 bgcolor=#fefefe
| 263520 ||  || — || March 4, 2008 || Kitt Peak || Spacewatch || V || align=right data-sort-value="0.75" | 750 m || 
|-id=521 bgcolor=#fefefe
| 263521 ||  || — || March 4, 2008 || Purple Mountain || PMO NEO || V || align=right data-sort-value="0.96" | 960 m || 
|-id=522 bgcolor=#fefefe
| 263522 ||  || — || March 12, 2008 || Kitt Peak || Spacewatch || — || align=right data-sort-value="0.72" | 720 m || 
|-id=523 bgcolor=#d6d6d6
| 263523 ||  || — || March 13, 2008 || Catalina || CSS || — || align=right | 5.2 km || 
|-id=524 bgcolor=#E9E9E9
| 263524 ||  || — || March 15, 2008 || Kitt Peak || Spacewatch || — || align=right | 2.3 km || 
|-id=525 bgcolor=#E9E9E9
| 263525 ||  || — || March 15, 2008 || Mount Lemmon || Mount Lemmon Survey || GEF || align=right | 1.4 km || 
|-id=526 bgcolor=#d6d6d6
| 263526 ||  || — || March 2, 2008 || Kitt Peak || Spacewatch || — || align=right | 2.9 km || 
|-id=527 bgcolor=#fefefe
| 263527 ||  || — || March 10, 2008 || Kitt Peak || Spacewatch || — || align=right data-sort-value="0.77" | 770 m || 
|-id=528 bgcolor=#E9E9E9
| 263528 ||  || — || March 5, 2008 || Kitt Peak || Spacewatch || HEN || align=right | 1.1 km || 
|-id=529 bgcolor=#d6d6d6
| 263529 ||  || — || March 13, 2008 || Catalina || CSS || — || align=right | 4.9 km || 
|-id=530 bgcolor=#E9E9E9
| 263530 ||  || — || March 5, 2008 || Kitt Peak || Spacewatch || — || align=right | 2.5 km || 
|-id=531 bgcolor=#fefefe
| 263531 ||  || — || March 25, 2008 || Kitt Peak || Spacewatch || — || align=right | 1.1 km || 
|-id=532 bgcolor=#E9E9E9
| 263532 ||  || — || March 25, 2008 || Kitt Peak || Spacewatch || AGN || align=right | 1.5 km || 
|-id=533 bgcolor=#fefefe
| 263533 ||  || — || March 25, 2008 || Kitt Peak || Spacewatch || — || align=right | 1.1 km || 
|-id=534 bgcolor=#d6d6d6
| 263534 ||  || — || March 25, 2008 || Kitt Peak || Spacewatch || — || align=right | 4.3 km || 
|-id=535 bgcolor=#fefefe
| 263535 ||  || — || March 30, 2008 || Modra || Š. Gajdoš, J. Világi || — || align=right | 1.1 km || 
|-id=536 bgcolor=#d6d6d6
| 263536 ||  || — || March 25, 2008 || Kitt Peak || Spacewatch || — || align=right | 2.8 km || 
|-id=537 bgcolor=#E9E9E9
| 263537 ||  || — || March 25, 2008 || Kitt Peak || Spacewatch || — || align=right | 3.1 km || 
|-id=538 bgcolor=#fefefe
| 263538 ||  || — || March 26, 2008 || Mount Lemmon || Mount Lemmon Survey || — || align=right data-sort-value="0.96" | 960 m || 
|-id=539 bgcolor=#E9E9E9
| 263539 ||  || — || March 27, 2008 || Mount Lemmon || Mount Lemmon Survey || — || align=right | 2.6 km || 
|-id=540 bgcolor=#E9E9E9
| 263540 ||  || — || March 27, 2008 || Kitt Peak || Spacewatch || — || align=right | 3.0 km || 
|-id=541 bgcolor=#E9E9E9
| 263541 ||  || — || March 27, 2008 || Kitt Peak || Spacewatch || PAD || align=right | 2.0 km || 
|-id=542 bgcolor=#E9E9E9
| 263542 ||  || — || March 27, 2008 || Kitt Peak || Spacewatch || — || align=right | 1.3 km || 
|-id=543 bgcolor=#d6d6d6
| 263543 ||  || — || March 27, 2008 || Kitt Peak || Spacewatch || — || align=right | 3.4 km || 
|-id=544 bgcolor=#fefefe
| 263544 ||  || — || March 27, 2008 || Lulin || LUSS || NYS || align=right data-sort-value="0.72" | 720 m || 
|-id=545 bgcolor=#fefefe
| 263545 ||  || — || March 28, 2008 || Kitt Peak || Spacewatch || — || align=right data-sort-value="0.98" | 980 m || 
|-id=546 bgcolor=#fefefe
| 263546 ||  || — || March 28, 2008 || Mount Lemmon || Mount Lemmon Survey || NYS || align=right data-sort-value="0.71" | 710 m || 
|-id=547 bgcolor=#fefefe
| 263547 ||  || — || March 28, 2008 || Mount Lemmon || Mount Lemmon Survey || — || align=right data-sort-value="0.80" | 800 m || 
|-id=548 bgcolor=#E9E9E9
| 263548 ||  || — || March 28, 2008 || Mount Lemmon || Mount Lemmon Survey || — || align=right | 3.3 km || 
|-id=549 bgcolor=#E9E9E9
| 263549 ||  || — || March 28, 2008 || Mount Lemmon || Mount Lemmon Survey || — || align=right | 1.6 km || 
|-id=550 bgcolor=#E9E9E9
| 263550 ||  || — || March 28, 2008 || Mount Lemmon || Mount Lemmon Survey || — || align=right | 2.8 km || 
|-id=551 bgcolor=#d6d6d6
| 263551 ||  || — || March 28, 2008 || Mount Lemmon || Mount Lemmon Survey || — || align=right | 3.0 km || 
|-id=552 bgcolor=#E9E9E9
| 263552 ||  || — || March 28, 2008 || Kitt Peak || Spacewatch || WIT || align=right | 1.4 km || 
|-id=553 bgcolor=#d6d6d6
| 263553 ||  || — || March 28, 2008 || Mount Lemmon || Mount Lemmon Survey || — || align=right | 2.6 km || 
|-id=554 bgcolor=#E9E9E9
| 263554 ||  || — || March 28, 2008 || Mount Lemmon || Mount Lemmon Survey || NEM || align=right | 2.4 km || 
|-id=555 bgcolor=#fefefe
| 263555 ||  || — || March 28, 2008 || Mount Lemmon || Mount Lemmon Survey || NYS || align=right data-sort-value="0.74" | 740 m || 
|-id=556 bgcolor=#d6d6d6
| 263556 ||  || — || March 28, 2008 || Kitt Peak || Spacewatch || — || align=right | 4.0 km || 
|-id=557 bgcolor=#E9E9E9
| 263557 ||  || — || March 29, 2008 || Kitt Peak || Spacewatch || — || align=right | 3.1 km || 
|-id=558 bgcolor=#E9E9E9
| 263558 ||  || — || March 29, 2008 || Mount Lemmon || Mount Lemmon Survey || — || align=right | 1.9 km || 
|-id=559 bgcolor=#E9E9E9
| 263559 ||  || — || March 29, 2008 || Mount Lemmon || Mount Lemmon Survey || — || align=right | 1.8 km || 
|-id=560 bgcolor=#E9E9E9
| 263560 ||  || — || March 30, 2008 || Catalina || CSS || — || align=right | 1.9 km || 
|-id=561 bgcolor=#fefefe
| 263561 ||  || — || March 28, 2008 || Kitt Peak || Spacewatch || NYS || align=right data-sort-value="0.78" | 780 m || 
|-id=562 bgcolor=#E9E9E9
| 263562 ||  || — || March 28, 2008 || Mount Lemmon || Mount Lemmon Survey || HOF || align=right | 3.4 km || 
|-id=563 bgcolor=#E9E9E9
| 263563 ||  || — || March 28, 2008 || Mount Lemmon || Mount Lemmon Survey || — || align=right | 1.5 km || 
|-id=564 bgcolor=#E9E9E9
| 263564 ||  || — || March 28, 2008 || Kitt Peak || Spacewatch || — || align=right | 2.0 km || 
|-id=565 bgcolor=#E9E9E9
| 263565 ||  || — || March 28, 2008 || Kitt Peak || Spacewatch || — || align=right | 1.9 km || 
|-id=566 bgcolor=#fefefe
| 263566 ||  || — || March 28, 2008 || Kitt Peak || Spacewatch || — || align=right | 1.7 km || 
|-id=567 bgcolor=#fefefe
| 263567 ||  || — || March 29, 2008 || Catalina || CSS || — || align=right | 1.1 km || 
|-id=568 bgcolor=#fefefe
| 263568 ||  || — || March 29, 2008 || Catalina || CSS || — || align=right | 1.2 km || 
|-id=569 bgcolor=#E9E9E9
| 263569 ||  || — || March 30, 2008 || Kitt Peak || Spacewatch || — || align=right | 1.3 km || 
|-id=570 bgcolor=#fefefe
| 263570 ||  || — || March 29, 2008 || Catalina || CSS || — || align=right | 1.2 km || 
|-id=571 bgcolor=#d6d6d6
| 263571 ||  || — || March 30, 2008 || Socorro || LINEAR || — || align=right | 3.7 km || 
|-id=572 bgcolor=#E9E9E9
| 263572 ||  || — || March 27, 2008 || Mount Lemmon || Mount Lemmon Survey || — || align=right | 1.1 km || 
|-id=573 bgcolor=#E9E9E9
| 263573 ||  || — || March 27, 2008 || Mount Lemmon || Mount Lemmon Survey || NEM || align=right | 2.6 km || 
|-id=574 bgcolor=#E9E9E9
| 263574 ||  || — || March 27, 2008 || Mount Lemmon || Mount Lemmon Survey || — || align=right | 3.1 km || 
|-id=575 bgcolor=#d6d6d6
| 263575 ||  || — || March 28, 2008 || Kitt Peak || Spacewatch || — || align=right | 3.2 km || 
|-id=576 bgcolor=#fefefe
| 263576 ||  || — || March 28, 2008 || Mount Lemmon || Mount Lemmon Survey || — || align=right data-sort-value="0.81" | 810 m || 
|-id=577 bgcolor=#E9E9E9
| 263577 ||  || — || March 28, 2008 || Kitt Peak || Spacewatch || AGN || align=right | 1.2 km || 
|-id=578 bgcolor=#E9E9E9
| 263578 ||  || — || March 28, 2008 || Kitt Peak || Spacewatch || — || align=right | 1.9 km || 
|-id=579 bgcolor=#d6d6d6
| 263579 ||  || — || March 28, 2008 || Mount Lemmon || Mount Lemmon Survey || KOR || align=right | 1.4 km || 
|-id=580 bgcolor=#fefefe
| 263580 ||  || — || March 29, 2008 || Mount Lemmon || Mount Lemmon Survey || FLO || align=right data-sort-value="0.68" | 680 m || 
|-id=581 bgcolor=#fefefe
| 263581 ||  || — || March 29, 2008 || Mount Lemmon || Mount Lemmon Survey || — || align=right data-sort-value="0.86" | 860 m || 
|-id=582 bgcolor=#fefefe
| 263582 ||  || — || March 29, 2008 || Mount Lemmon || Mount Lemmon Survey || — || align=right data-sort-value="0.94" | 940 m || 
|-id=583 bgcolor=#E9E9E9
| 263583 ||  || — || March 29, 2008 || Mount Lemmon || Mount Lemmon Survey || — || align=right | 1.1 km || 
|-id=584 bgcolor=#E9E9E9
| 263584 ||  || — || March 29, 2008 || Kitt Peak || Spacewatch || — || align=right | 2.6 km || 
|-id=585 bgcolor=#d6d6d6
| 263585 ||  || — || March 30, 2008 || Kitt Peak || Spacewatch || — || align=right | 3.4 km || 
|-id=586 bgcolor=#d6d6d6
| 263586 ||  || — || March 30, 2008 || Kitt Peak || Spacewatch || — || align=right | 3.4 km || 
|-id=587 bgcolor=#d6d6d6
| 263587 ||  || — || March 31, 2008 || Kitt Peak || Spacewatch || — || align=right | 2.6 km || 
|-id=588 bgcolor=#d6d6d6
| 263588 ||  || — || March 31, 2008 || Kitt Peak || Spacewatch || — || align=right | 3.7 km || 
|-id=589 bgcolor=#fefefe
| 263589 ||  || — || March 31, 2008 || Kitt Peak || Spacewatch || — || align=right data-sort-value="0.83" | 830 m || 
|-id=590 bgcolor=#d6d6d6
| 263590 ||  || — || March 31, 2008 || Kitt Peak || Spacewatch || URS || align=right | 4.5 km || 
|-id=591 bgcolor=#d6d6d6
| 263591 ||  || — || March 31, 2008 || Kitt Peak || Spacewatch || KOR || align=right | 1.4 km || 
|-id=592 bgcolor=#d6d6d6
| 263592 ||  || — || March 31, 2008 || Mount Lemmon || Mount Lemmon Survey || KOR || align=right | 1.7 km || 
|-id=593 bgcolor=#d6d6d6
| 263593 ||  || — || March 31, 2008 || Mount Lemmon || Mount Lemmon Survey || — || align=right | 2.9 km || 
|-id=594 bgcolor=#fefefe
| 263594 ||  || — || March 31, 2008 || Mount Lemmon || Mount Lemmon Survey || NYS || align=right data-sort-value="0.70" | 700 m || 
|-id=595 bgcolor=#fefefe
| 263595 ||  || — || March 31, 2008 || Kitt Peak || Spacewatch || — || align=right | 1.1 km || 
|-id=596 bgcolor=#E9E9E9
| 263596 ||  || — || March 31, 2008 || Mount Lemmon || Mount Lemmon Survey || — || align=right | 1.3 km || 
|-id=597 bgcolor=#E9E9E9
| 263597 ||  || — || March 29, 2008 || Kitt Peak || Spacewatch || — || align=right | 2.8 km || 
|-id=598 bgcolor=#E9E9E9
| 263598 ||  || — || March 30, 2008 || Kitt Peak || Spacewatch || — || align=right | 1.8 km || 
|-id=599 bgcolor=#d6d6d6
| 263599 ||  || — || March 30, 2008 || Kitt Peak || Spacewatch || — || align=right | 4.0 km || 
|-id=600 bgcolor=#fefefe
| 263600 ||  || — || March 31, 2008 || Kitt Peak || Spacewatch || — || align=right data-sort-value="0.89" | 890 m || 
|}

263601–263700 

|-bgcolor=#fefefe
| 263601 ||  || — || March 31, 2008 || Kitt Peak || Spacewatch || — || align=right data-sort-value="0.94" | 940 m || 
|-id=602 bgcolor=#d6d6d6
| 263602 ||  || — || March 31, 2008 || Kitt Peak || Spacewatch || — || align=right | 2.5 km || 
|-id=603 bgcolor=#E9E9E9
| 263603 ||  || — || March 31, 2008 || Catalina || CSS || MIS || align=right | 4.0 km || 
|-id=604 bgcolor=#d6d6d6
| 263604 ||  || — || March 29, 2008 || Catalina || CSS || — || align=right | 5.7 km || 
|-id=605 bgcolor=#E9E9E9
| 263605 ||  || — || March 28, 2008 || Mount Lemmon || Mount Lemmon Survey || HEN || align=right | 1.4 km || 
|-id=606 bgcolor=#E9E9E9
| 263606 ||  || — || March 28, 2008 || Mount Lemmon || Mount Lemmon Survey || — || align=right | 1.7 km || 
|-id=607 bgcolor=#E9E9E9
| 263607 ||  || — || March 31, 2008 || Mount Lemmon || Mount Lemmon Survey || — || align=right | 1.6 km || 
|-id=608 bgcolor=#d6d6d6
| 263608 ||  || — || March 31, 2008 || Mount Lemmon || Mount Lemmon Survey || — || align=right | 3.1 km || 
|-id=609 bgcolor=#E9E9E9
| 263609 ||  || — || March 28, 2008 || Kitt Peak || Spacewatch || — || align=right | 1.6 km || 
|-id=610 bgcolor=#fefefe
| 263610 ||  || — || March 28, 2008 || Mount Lemmon || Mount Lemmon Survey || V || align=right data-sort-value="0.87" | 870 m || 
|-id=611 bgcolor=#E9E9E9
| 263611 ||  || — || March 29, 2008 || Catalina || CSS || — || align=right | 3.6 km || 
|-id=612 bgcolor=#fefefe
| 263612 ||  || — || April 3, 2008 || La Sagra || OAM Obs. || — || align=right | 1.1 km || 
|-id=613 bgcolor=#fefefe
| 263613 Enol ||  ||  || April 3, 2008 || La Cañada || J. Lacruz || — || align=right data-sort-value="0.79" | 790 m || 
|-id=614 bgcolor=#d6d6d6
| 263614 ||  || — || April 1, 2008 || Goodricke-Pigott || R. A. Tucker || THB || align=right | 6.3 km || 
|-id=615 bgcolor=#d6d6d6
| 263615 ||  || — || April 1, 2008 || Kitt Peak || Spacewatch || — || align=right | 3.4 km || 
|-id=616 bgcolor=#E9E9E9
| 263616 ||  || — || April 1, 2008 || Kitt Peak || Spacewatch || WIT || align=right | 1.1 km || 
|-id=617 bgcolor=#d6d6d6
| 263617 ||  || — || April 3, 2008 || Mount Lemmon || Mount Lemmon Survey || — || align=right | 5.5 km || 
|-id=618 bgcolor=#E9E9E9
| 263618 ||  || — || April 3, 2008 || Kitt Peak || Spacewatch || — || align=right | 1.4 km || 
|-id=619 bgcolor=#E9E9E9
| 263619 ||  || — || April 1, 2008 || Mount Lemmon || Mount Lemmon Survey || — || align=right | 1.7 km || 
|-id=620 bgcolor=#d6d6d6
| 263620 ||  || — || April 1, 2008 || Mount Lemmon || Mount Lemmon Survey || ELF || align=right | 5.3 km || 
|-id=621 bgcolor=#fefefe
| 263621 ||  || — || April 3, 2008 || Mount Lemmon || Mount Lemmon Survey || MAS || align=right data-sort-value="0.63" | 630 m || 
|-id=622 bgcolor=#fefefe
| 263622 ||  || — || April 3, 2008 || Kitt Peak || Spacewatch || — || align=right | 1.1 km || 
|-id=623 bgcolor=#d6d6d6
| 263623 ||  || — || April 3, 2008 || Kitt Peak || Spacewatch || — || align=right | 3.7 km || 
|-id=624 bgcolor=#d6d6d6
| 263624 ||  || — || April 4, 2008 || Kitt Peak || Spacewatch || — || align=right | 3.6 km || 
|-id=625 bgcolor=#d6d6d6
| 263625 ||  || — || April 4, 2008 || Kitt Peak || Spacewatch || — || align=right | 3.3 km || 
|-id=626 bgcolor=#d6d6d6
| 263626 ||  || — || April 4, 2008 || Kitt Peak || Spacewatch || — || align=right | 5.6 km || 
|-id=627 bgcolor=#E9E9E9
| 263627 ||  || — || April 4, 2008 || Kitt Peak || Spacewatch || — || align=right | 2.4 km || 
|-id=628 bgcolor=#E9E9E9
| 263628 ||  || — || April 5, 2008 || Kitt Peak || Spacewatch || — || align=right | 1.6 km || 
|-id=629 bgcolor=#E9E9E9
| 263629 ||  || — || April 5, 2008 || Kitt Peak || Spacewatch || — || align=right | 1.8 km || 
|-id=630 bgcolor=#E9E9E9
| 263630 ||  || — || April 5, 2008 || Mount Lemmon || Mount Lemmon Survey || — || align=right | 3.0 km || 
|-id=631 bgcolor=#E9E9E9
| 263631 ||  || — || April 5, 2008 || Mount Lemmon || Mount Lemmon Survey || — || align=right | 1.6 km || 
|-id=632 bgcolor=#E9E9E9
| 263632 ||  || — || April 5, 2008 || Catalina || CSS || — || align=right | 2.6 km || 
|-id=633 bgcolor=#E9E9E9
| 263633 ||  || — || April 5, 2008 || Catalina || CSS || — || align=right | 3.6 km || 
|-id=634 bgcolor=#fefefe
| 263634 ||  || — || April 5, 2008 || Catalina || CSS || MAS || align=right data-sort-value="0.79" | 790 m || 
|-id=635 bgcolor=#d6d6d6
| 263635 ||  || — || April 6, 2008 || Kitt Peak || Spacewatch || — || align=right | 3.0 km || 
|-id=636 bgcolor=#d6d6d6
| 263636 ||  || — || April 6, 2008 || Kitt Peak || Spacewatch || THM || align=right | 3.6 km || 
|-id=637 bgcolor=#d6d6d6
| 263637 ||  || — || April 6, 2008 || Mount Lemmon || Mount Lemmon Survey || — || align=right | 4.4 km || 
|-id=638 bgcolor=#d6d6d6
| 263638 ||  || — || April 6, 2008 || Mount Lemmon || Mount Lemmon Survey || — || align=right | 4.0 km || 
|-id=639 bgcolor=#fefefe
| 263639 ||  || — || April 7, 2008 || Mount Lemmon || Mount Lemmon Survey || MAS || align=right data-sort-value="0.64" | 640 m || 
|-id=640 bgcolor=#d6d6d6
| 263640 ||  || — || April 7, 2008 || Kitt Peak || Spacewatch || ALA || align=right | 3.9 km || 
|-id=641 bgcolor=#d6d6d6
| 263641 ||  || — || April 7, 2008 || Kitt Peak || Spacewatch || — || align=right | 2.8 km || 
|-id=642 bgcolor=#d6d6d6
| 263642 ||  || — || April 7, 2008 || Kitt Peak || Spacewatch || — || align=right | 3.3 km || 
|-id=643 bgcolor=#d6d6d6
| 263643 ||  || — || April 7, 2008 || Kitt Peak || Spacewatch || BRA || align=right | 1.6 km || 
|-id=644 bgcolor=#d6d6d6
| 263644 ||  || — || April 7, 2008 || Kitt Peak || Spacewatch || — || align=right | 2.8 km || 
|-id=645 bgcolor=#fefefe
| 263645 ||  || — || April 8, 2008 || Kitt Peak || Spacewatch || — || align=right | 1.0 km || 
|-id=646 bgcolor=#E9E9E9
| 263646 ||  || — || April 8, 2008 || Mount Lemmon || Mount Lemmon Survey || AGN || align=right | 1.6 km || 
|-id=647 bgcolor=#fefefe
| 263647 ||  || — || April 9, 2008 || Kitt Peak || Spacewatch || MAS || align=right data-sort-value="0.80" | 800 m || 
|-id=648 bgcolor=#fefefe
| 263648 ||  || — || April 9, 2008 || Kitt Peak || Spacewatch || — || align=right | 1.0 km || 
|-id=649 bgcolor=#E9E9E9
| 263649 ||  || — || April 6, 2008 || Kitt Peak || Spacewatch || — || align=right | 1.7 km || 
|-id=650 bgcolor=#d6d6d6
| 263650 ||  || — || April 6, 2008 || Kitt Peak || Spacewatch || EOS || align=right | 2.5 km || 
|-id=651 bgcolor=#d6d6d6
| 263651 ||  || — || April 6, 2008 || Mount Lemmon || Mount Lemmon Survey || — || align=right | 2.9 km || 
|-id=652 bgcolor=#E9E9E9
| 263652 ||  || — || April 6, 2008 || Mount Lemmon || Mount Lemmon Survey || WIT || align=right | 1.1 km || 
|-id=653 bgcolor=#E9E9E9
| 263653 ||  || — || April 8, 2008 || Kitt Peak || Spacewatch || — || align=right | 1.2 km || 
|-id=654 bgcolor=#E9E9E9
| 263654 ||  || — || April 8, 2008 || Kitt Peak || Spacewatch || — || align=right | 1.3 km || 
|-id=655 bgcolor=#d6d6d6
| 263655 ||  || — || April 9, 2008 || Kitt Peak || Spacewatch || — || align=right | 5.5 km || 
|-id=656 bgcolor=#E9E9E9
| 263656 ||  || — || April 9, 2008 || Kitt Peak || Spacewatch || — || align=right | 2.1 km || 
|-id=657 bgcolor=#E9E9E9
| 263657 ||  || — || April 10, 2008 || Kitt Peak || Spacewatch || — || align=right | 1.7 km || 
|-id=658 bgcolor=#E9E9E9
| 263658 ||  || — || April 10, 2008 || Kitt Peak || Spacewatch || — || align=right | 3.4 km || 
|-id=659 bgcolor=#d6d6d6
| 263659 ||  || — || April 10, 2008 || Kitt Peak || Spacewatch || KOR || align=right | 1.6 km || 
|-id=660 bgcolor=#d6d6d6
| 263660 ||  || — || April 11, 2008 || Kitt Peak || Spacewatch || — || align=right | 3.1 km || 
|-id=661 bgcolor=#E9E9E9
| 263661 ||  || — || April 11, 2008 || Kitt Peak || Spacewatch || EUN || align=right | 1.4 km || 
|-id=662 bgcolor=#E9E9E9
| 263662 ||  || — || April 11, 2008 || Kitt Peak || Spacewatch || HOF || align=right | 3.0 km || 
|-id=663 bgcolor=#d6d6d6
| 263663 ||  || — || April 13, 2008 || Mount Lemmon || Mount Lemmon Survey || — || align=right | 4.3 km || 
|-id=664 bgcolor=#d6d6d6
| 263664 ||  || — || April 13, 2008 || Calvin-Rehoboth || Calvin–Rehoboth Obs. || — || align=right | 3.4 km || 
|-id=665 bgcolor=#d6d6d6
| 263665 ||  || — || April 3, 2008 || Catalina || CSS || — || align=right | 6.0 km || 
|-id=666 bgcolor=#E9E9E9
| 263666 ||  || — || April 13, 2008 || Catalina || CSS || MAR || align=right | 1.8 km || 
|-id=667 bgcolor=#d6d6d6
| 263667 ||  || — || April 9, 2008 || Kitt Peak || Spacewatch || — || align=right | 3.3 km || 
|-id=668 bgcolor=#fefefe
| 263668 ||  || — || April 9, 2008 || Kitt Peak || Spacewatch || MAS || align=right data-sort-value="0.76" | 760 m || 
|-id=669 bgcolor=#E9E9E9
| 263669 ||  || — || April 9, 2008 || Kitt Peak || Spacewatch || — || align=right | 1.2 km || 
|-id=670 bgcolor=#fefefe
| 263670 ||  || — || April 11, 2008 || Catalina || CSS || NYS || align=right data-sort-value="0.77" | 770 m || 
|-id=671 bgcolor=#E9E9E9
| 263671 ||  || — || April 11, 2008 || Kitt Peak || Spacewatch || WIT || align=right | 1.1 km || 
|-id=672 bgcolor=#d6d6d6
| 263672 ||  || — || April 11, 2008 || Kitt Peak || Spacewatch || — || align=right | 3.0 km || 
|-id=673 bgcolor=#fefefe
| 263673 ||  || — || April 12, 2008 || Kitt Peak || Spacewatch || NYS || align=right data-sort-value="0.71" | 710 m || 
|-id=674 bgcolor=#fefefe
| 263674 ||  || — || April 12, 2008 || Catalina || CSS || V || align=right | 1.2 km || 
|-id=675 bgcolor=#fefefe
| 263675 ||  || — || April 13, 2008 || Kitt Peak || Spacewatch || NYS || align=right data-sort-value="0.66" | 660 m || 
|-id=676 bgcolor=#E9E9E9
| 263676 ||  || — || April 13, 2008 || Kitt Peak || Spacewatch || — || align=right | 1.8 km || 
|-id=677 bgcolor=#E9E9E9
| 263677 ||  || — || April 13, 2008 || Kitt Peak || Spacewatch || — || align=right | 2.0 km || 
|-id=678 bgcolor=#d6d6d6
| 263678 ||  || — || April 13, 2008 || Kitt Peak || Spacewatch || SYL7:4 || align=right | 7.9 km || 
|-id=679 bgcolor=#d6d6d6
| 263679 ||  || — || April 14, 2008 || Mount Lemmon || Mount Lemmon Survey || — || align=right | 3.9 km || 
|-id=680 bgcolor=#d6d6d6
| 263680 ||  || — || April 4, 2008 || Mount Lemmon || Mount Lemmon Survey || EOS || align=right | 3.0 km || 
|-id=681 bgcolor=#d6d6d6
| 263681 ||  || — || April 5, 2008 || Catalina || CSS || — || align=right | 3.7 km || 
|-id=682 bgcolor=#d6d6d6
| 263682 ||  || — || April 1, 2008 || Kitt Peak || Spacewatch || HYG || align=right | 2.8 km || 
|-id=683 bgcolor=#E9E9E9
| 263683 ||  || — || April 3, 2008 || Kitt Peak || Spacewatch || — || align=right | 1.8 km || 
|-id=684 bgcolor=#d6d6d6
| 263684 ||  || — || April 6, 2008 || Catalina || CSS || ALA || align=right | 4.6 km || 
|-id=685 bgcolor=#E9E9E9
| 263685 ||  || — || April 7, 2008 || Kitt Peak || Spacewatch || — || align=right | 3.0 km || 
|-id=686 bgcolor=#E9E9E9
| 263686 ||  || — || April 13, 2008 || Mount Lemmon || Mount Lemmon Survey || GEF || align=right | 1.6 km || 
|-id=687 bgcolor=#d6d6d6
| 263687 ||  || — || April 3, 2008 || Mount Lemmon || Mount Lemmon Survey || EOS || align=right | 2.6 km || 
|-id=688 bgcolor=#d6d6d6
| 263688 ||  || — || April 1, 2008 || Mount Lemmon || Mount Lemmon Survey || EOS || align=right | 2.0 km || 
|-id=689 bgcolor=#E9E9E9
| 263689 ||  || — || April 5, 2008 || Kitt Peak || Spacewatch || — || align=right | 1.1 km || 
|-id=690 bgcolor=#E9E9E9
| 263690 ||  || — || April 4, 2008 || Kitt Peak || Spacewatch || — || align=right | 1.8 km || 
|-id=691 bgcolor=#E9E9E9
| 263691 ||  || — || April 9, 2008 || Kitt Peak || Spacewatch || — || align=right | 2.6 km || 
|-id=692 bgcolor=#d6d6d6
| 263692 ||  || — || April 14, 2008 || Mount Lemmon || Mount Lemmon Survey || ANF || align=right | 2.0 km || 
|-id=693 bgcolor=#d6d6d6
| 263693 ||  || — || April 1, 2008 || Kitt Peak || Spacewatch || — || align=right | 2.5 km || 
|-id=694 bgcolor=#E9E9E9
| 263694 ||  || — || April 29, 2008 || La Sagra || OAM Obs. || — || align=right | 2.0 km || 
|-id=695 bgcolor=#E9E9E9
| 263695 ||  || — || April 24, 2008 || Mount Lemmon || Mount Lemmon Survey || — || align=right | 1.5 km || 
|-id=696 bgcolor=#E9E9E9
| 263696 ||  || — || April 24, 2008 || Kitt Peak || Spacewatch || GEF || align=right | 1.7 km || 
|-id=697 bgcolor=#d6d6d6
| 263697 ||  || — || April 24, 2008 || Kitt Peak || Spacewatch || — || align=right | 3.4 km || 
|-id=698 bgcolor=#d6d6d6
| 263698 ||  || — || April 24, 2008 || Kitt Peak || Spacewatch || EOS || align=right | 2.3 km || 
|-id=699 bgcolor=#C2FFFF
| 263699 ||  || — || April 24, 2008 || Kitt Peak || Spacewatch || L5 || align=right | 11 km || 
|-id=700 bgcolor=#E9E9E9
| 263700 ||  || — || April 25, 2008 || Kitt Peak || Spacewatch || — || align=right | 1.1 km || 
|}

263701–263800 

|-bgcolor=#E9E9E9
| 263701 ||  || — || April 25, 2008 || Kitt Peak || Spacewatch || — || align=right | 2.3 km || 
|-id=702 bgcolor=#E9E9E9
| 263702 ||  || — || April 26, 2008 || Kitt Peak || Spacewatch || — || align=right | 1.3 km || 
|-id=703 bgcolor=#E9E9E9
| 263703 ||  || — || April 26, 2008 || Mount Lemmon || Mount Lemmon Survey || — || align=right data-sort-value="0.88" | 880 m || 
|-id=704 bgcolor=#d6d6d6
| 263704 ||  || — || April 27, 2008 || Kitt Peak || Spacewatch || EOS || align=right | 2.2 km || 
|-id=705 bgcolor=#d6d6d6
| 263705 ||  || — || April 27, 2008 || Mount Lemmon || Mount Lemmon Survey || HYG || align=right | 3.7 km || 
|-id=706 bgcolor=#E9E9E9
| 263706 ||  || — || April 28, 2008 || Kitt Peak || Spacewatch || HOF || align=right | 2.8 km || 
|-id=707 bgcolor=#E9E9E9
| 263707 ||  || — || April 29, 2008 || Mount Lemmon || Mount Lemmon Survey || KON || align=right | 2.6 km || 
|-id=708 bgcolor=#E9E9E9
| 263708 ||  || — || April 29, 2008 || Mount Lemmon || Mount Lemmon Survey || MRX || align=right | 1.00 km || 
|-id=709 bgcolor=#d6d6d6
| 263709 ||  || — || April 27, 2008 || Kitt Peak || Spacewatch || 3:2 || align=right | 6.4 km || 
|-id=710 bgcolor=#E9E9E9
| 263710 ||  || — || April 27, 2008 || Kitt Peak || Spacewatch || — || align=right | 2.3 km || 
|-id=711 bgcolor=#E9E9E9
| 263711 ||  || — || April 27, 2008 || Kitt Peak || Spacewatch || RAF || align=right | 1.2 km || 
|-id=712 bgcolor=#E9E9E9
| 263712 ||  || — || April 29, 2008 || Mount Lemmon || Mount Lemmon Survey || — || align=right | 1.2 km || 
|-id=713 bgcolor=#E9E9E9
| 263713 ||  || — || April 30, 2008 || Mount Lemmon || Mount Lemmon Survey || NEM || align=right | 2.6 km || 
|-id=714 bgcolor=#fefefe
| 263714 ||  || — || April 30, 2008 || La Sagra || OAM Obs. || — || align=right | 1.1 km || 
|-id=715 bgcolor=#E9E9E9
| 263715 ||  || — || April 26, 2008 || Mount Lemmon || Mount Lemmon Survey || — || align=right | 2.1 km || 
|-id=716 bgcolor=#d6d6d6
| 263716 ||  || — || April 26, 2008 || Mount Lemmon || Mount Lemmon Survey || — || align=right | 3.2 km || 
|-id=717 bgcolor=#fefefe
| 263717 ||  || — || April 26, 2008 || Mount Lemmon || Mount Lemmon Survey || NYS || align=right data-sort-value="0.86" | 860 m || 
|-id=718 bgcolor=#E9E9E9
| 263718 ||  || — || April 27, 2008 || Mount Lemmon || Mount Lemmon Survey || — || align=right | 3.0 km || 
|-id=719 bgcolor=#d6d6d6
| 263719 ||  || — || April 28, 2008 || Kitt Peak || Spacewatch || — || align=right | 3.9 km || 
|-id=720 bgcolor=#d6d6d6
| 263720 ||  || — || April 28, 2008 || Kitt Peak || Spacewatch || — || align=right | 4.7 km || 
|-id=721 bgcolor=#E9E9E9
| 263721 ||  || — || April 29, 2008 || Mount Lemmon || Mount Lemmon Survey || — || align=right | 2.6 km || 
|-id=722 bgcolor=#d6d6d6
| 263722 ||  || — || April 29, 2008 || Kitt Peak || Spacewatch || — || align=right | 3.5 km || 
|-id=723 bgcolor=#E9E9E9
| 263723 ||  || — || April 29, 2008 || Kitt Peak || Spacewatch || MRX || align=right | 1.2 km || 
|-id=724 bgcolor=#fefefe
| 263724 ||  || — || April 29, 2008 || Kitt Peak || Spacewatch || SUL || align=right | 2.5 km || 
|-id=725 bgcolor=#d6d6d6
| 263725 ||  || — || October 15, 1999 || Socorro || LINEAR || — || align=right | 5.3 km || 
|-id=726 bgcolor=#E9E9E9
| 263726 ||  || — || April 29, 2008 || Kitt Peak || Spacewatch || — || align=right | 2.8 km || 
|-id=727 bgcolor=#d6d6d6
| 263727 ||  || — || April 29, 2008 || Mount Lemmon || Mount Lemmon Survey || — || align=right | 3.9 km || 
|-id=728 bgcolor=#d6d6d6
| 263728 ||  || — || April 29, 2008 || Kitt Peak || Spacewatch || EOS || align=right | 2.5 km || 
|-id=729 bgcolor=#E9E9E9
| 263729 ||  || — || April 29, 2008 || Kitt Peak || Spacewatch || HEN || align=right | 1.2 km || 
|-id=730 bgcolor=#E9E9E9
| 263730 ||  || — || April 30, 2008 || Kitt Peak || Spacewatch || — || align=right | 1.9 km || 
|-id=731 bgcolor=#d6d6d6
| 263731 ||  || — || April 30, 2008 || Mount Lemmon || Mount Lemmon Survey || KOR || align=right | 1.4 km || 
|-id=732 bgcolor=#d6d6d6
| 263732 ||  || — || April 28, 2008 || Mount Lemmon || Mount Lemmon Survey || — || align=right | 3.9 km || 
|-id=733 bgcolor=#fefefe
| 263733 ||  || — || April 28, 2008 || Catalina || CSS || KLI || align=right | 3.5 km || 
|-id=734 bgcolor=#E9E9E9
| 263734 ||  || — || April 27, 2008 || Mount Lemmon || Mount Lemmon Survey || AER || align=right | 1.7 km || 
|-id=735 bgcolor=#d6d6d6
| 263735 ||  || — || May 1, 2008 || Kitt Peak || Spacewatch || — || align=right | 3.9 km || 
|-id=736 bgcolor=#d6d6d6
| 263736 ||  || — || May 1, 2008 || Kitt Peak || Spacewatch || — || align=right | 2.7 km || 
|-id=737 bgcolor=#d6d6d6
| 263737 ||  || — || May 1, 2008 || Kitt Peak || Spacewatch || EOS || align=right | 2.7 km || 
|-id=738 bgcolor=#d6d6d6
| 263738 ||  || — || May 3, 2008 || Mount Lemmon || Mount Lemmon Survey || — || align=right | 5.3 km || 
|-id=739 bgcolor=#d6d6d6
| 263739 ||  || — || May 3, 2008 || Kitt Peak || Spacewatch || — || align=right | 4.0 km || 
|-id=740 bgcolor=#d6d6d6
| 263740 ||  || — || May 6, 2008 || Dauban || F. Kugel || — || align=right | 3.9 km || 
|-id=741 bgcolor=#E9E9E9
| 263741 ||  || — || May 6, 2008 || Dauban || F. Kugel || — || align=right | 1.4 km || 
|-id=742 bgcolor=#E9E9E9
| 263742 ||  || — || May 4, 2008 || Kitt Peak || Spacewatch || — || align=right | 2.5 km || 
|-id=743 bgcolor=#d6d6d6
| 263743 ||  || — || May 8, 2008 || Kachina || J. Hobart || — || align=right | 3.5 km || 
|-id=744 bgcolor=#E9E9E9
| 263744 ||  || — || May 5, 2008 || Mount Lemmon || Mount Lemmon Survey || EUN || align=right | 1.8 km || 
|-id=745 bgcolor=#E9E9E9
| 263745 ||  || — || May 6, 2008 || Siding Spring || SSS || — || align=right | 3.8 km || 
|-id=746 bgcolor=#d6d6d6
| 263746 ||  || — || May 7, 2008 || Kitt Peak || Spacewatch || — || align=right | 4.2 km || 
|-id=747 bgcolor=#d6d6d6
| 263747 ||  || — || May 8, 2008 || Kitt Peak || Spacewatch || — || align=right | 3.8 km || 
|-id=748 bgcolor=#fefefe
| 263748 ||  || — || May 11, 2008 || Catalina || CSS || — || align=right | 1.1 km || 
|-id=749 bgcolor=#fefefe
| 263749 ||  || — || May 8, 2008 || Socorro || LINEAR || — || align=right | 1.3 km || 
|-id=750 bgcolor=#d6d6d6
| 263750 ||  || — || May 8, 2008 || Kitt Peak || Spacewatch || — || align=right | 3.1 km || 
|-id=751 bgcolor=#E9E9E9
| 263751 ||  || — || May 8, 2008 || Kitt Peak || Spacewatch || — || align=right | 1.1 km || 
|-id=752 bgcolor=#d6d6d6
| 263752 ||  || — || May 11, 2008 || Kitt Peak || Spacewatch || — || align=right | 4.5 km || 
|-id=753 bgcolor=#d6d6d6
| 263753 ||  || — || May 15, 2008 || Kitt Peak || Spacewatch || — || align=right | 4.2 km || 
|-id=754 bgcolor=#E9E9E9
| 263754 ||  || — || May 15, 2008 || Kitt Peak || Spacewatch || — || align=right | 3.5 km || 
|-id=755 bgcolor=#E9E9E9
| 263755 ||  || — || May 3, 2008 || Kitt Peak || Spacewatch || — || align=right | 3.2 km || 
|-id=756 bgcolor=#E9E9E9
| 263756 ||  || — || May 14, 2008 || Mount Lemmon || Mount Lemmon Survey || EUN || align=right | 1.8 km || 
|-id=757 bgcolor=#d6d6d6
| 263757 ||  || — || May 26, 2008 || Kachina || J. Hobart || — || align=right | 3.9 km || 
|-id=758 bgcolor=#d6d6d6
| 263758 ||  || — || May 27, 2008 || Kitt Peak || Spacewatch || — || align=right | 3.4 km || 
|-id=759 bgcolor=#E9E9E9
| 263759 ||  || — || May 26, 2008 || Mount Lemmon || Mount Lemmon Survey || — || align=right | 2.1 km || 
|-id=760 bgcolor=#E9E9E9
| 263760 ||  || — || May 27, 2008 || Kitt Peak || Spacewatch || HEN || align=right | 1.3 km || 
|-id=761 bgcolor=#d6d6d6
| 263761 ||  || — || May 27, 2008 || Kitt Peak || Spacewatch || — || align=right | 2.8 km || 
|-id=762 bgcolor=#d6d6d6
| 263762 ||  || — || May 29, 2008 || Mount Lemmon || Mount Lemmon Survey || — || align=right | 4.0 km || 
|-id=763 bgcolor=#E9E9E9
| 263763 ||  || — || May 28, 2008 || Calvin-Rehoboth || Calvin–Rehoboth Obs. || — || align=right | 1.7 km || 
|-id=764 bgcolor=#E9E9E9
| 263764 ||  || — || May 26, 2008 || Mount Lemmon || Mount Lemmon Survey || — || align=right | 1.1 km || 
|-id=765 bgcolor=#d6d6d6
| 263765 ||  || — || May 27, 2008 || Kitt Peak || Spacewatch || TIR || align=right | 3.9 km || 
|-id=766 bgcolor=#E9E9E9
| 263766 ||  || — || May 27, 2008 || Kitt Peak || Spacewatch || — || align=right | 1.5 km || 
|-id=767 bgcolor=#d6d6d6
| 263767 ||  || — || May 27, 2008 || Kitt Peak || Spacewatch || — || align=right | 3.5 km || 
|-id=768 bgcolor=#d6d6d6
| 263768 ||  || — || May 27, 2008 || Kitt Peak || Spacewatch || — || align=right | 3.5 km || 
|-id=769 bgcolor=#E9E9E9
| 263769 ||  || — || May 29, 2008 || Mount Lemmon || Mount Lemmon Survey || EUN || align=right | 1.2 km || 
|-id=770 bgcolor=#d6d6d6
| 263770 ||  || — || May 31, 2008 || Mount Lemmon || Mount Lemmon Survey || — || align=right | 4.3 km || 
|-id=771 bgcolor=#E9E9E9
| 263771 ||  || — || May 27, 2008 || Mount Lemmon || Mount Lemmon Survey || TIN || align=right | 2.6 km || 
|-id=772 bgcolor=#d6d6d6
| 263772 ||  || — || May 30, 2008 || Mount Lemmon || Mount Lemmon Survey || LIX || align=right | 5.2 km || 
|-id=773 bgcolor=#d6d6d6
| 263773 ||  || — || May 29, 2008 || Kitt Peak || Spacewatch || EOS || align=right | 2.3 km || 
|-id=774 bgcolor=#d6d6d6
| 263774 ||  || — || May 30, 2008 || Kitt Peak || Spacewatch || — || align=right | 3.1 km || 
|-id=775 bgcolor=#d6d6d6
| 263775 ||  || — || May 29, 2008 || Grove Creek || F. Tozzi || HYG || align=right | 4.0 km || 
|-id=776 bgcolor=#d6d6d6
| 263776 ||  || — || June 1, 2008 || Kitt Peak || Spacewatch || — || align=right | 2.9 km || 
|-id=777 bgcolor=#E9E9E9
| 263777 ||  || — || June 1, 2008 || Kitt Peak || Spacewatch || — || align=right | 1.4 km || 
|-id=778 bgcolor=#E9E9E9
| 263778 ||  || — || June 1, 2008 || Kitt Peak || Spacewatch || — || align=right | 1.8 km || 
|-id=779 bgcolor=#d6d6d6
| 263779 ||  || — || June 1, 2008 || Mount Lemmon || Mount Lemmon Survey || — || align=right | 4.5 km || 
|-id=780 bgcolor=#d6d6d6
| 263780 ||  || — || June 3, 2008 || Kitt Peak || Spacewatch || ALA || align=right | 5.2 km || 
|-id=781 bgcolor=#E9E9E9
| 263781 ||  || — || June 3, 2008 || Mount Lemmon || Mount Lemmon Survey || RAF || align=right | 1.4 km || 
|-id=782 bgcolor=#d6d6d6
| 263782 ||  || — || June 3, 2008 || Kitt Peak || Spacewatch || — || align=right | 3.6 km || 
|-id=783 bgcolor=#fefefe
| 263783 ||  || — || June 3, 2008 || Kitt Peak || Spacewatch || — || align=right | 1.2 km || 
|-id=784 bgcolor=#E9E9E9
| 263784 ||  || — || June 6, 2008 || Kitt Peak || Spacewatch || — || align=right | 1.1 km || 
|-id=785 bgcolor=#fefefe
| 263785 ||  || — || June 6, 2008 || Kitt Peak || Spacewatch || — || align=right | 1.1 km || 
|-id=786 bgcolor=#E9E9E9
| 263786 ||  || — || June 7, 2008 || Kitt Peak || Spacewatch || EUN || align=right | 1.4 km || 
|-id=787 bgcolor=#d6d6d6
| 263787 ||  || — || June 11, 2008 || Kitt Peak || Spacewatch || URS || align=right | 4.1 km || 
|-id=788 bgcolor=#d6d6d6
| 263788 ||  || — || June 30, 2008 || Kitt Peak || Spacewatch || — || align=right | 4.3 km || 
|-id=789 bgcolor=#E9E9E9
| 263789 ||  || — || June 27, 2008 || Cerro Burek || Alianza S4 Obs. || — || align=right | 3.5 km || 
|-id=790 bgcolor=#E9E9E9
| 263790 ||  || — || August 10, 2008 || Črni Vrh || Črni Vrh || INO || align=right | 1.9 km || 
|-id=791 bgcolor=#E9E9E9
| 263791 ||  || — || August 23, 2008 || Socorro || LINEAR || — || align=right | 2.3 km || 
|-id=792 bgcolor=#C2FFFF
| 263792 ||  || — || August 25, 2008 || La Sagra || OAM Obs. || L4 || align=right | 15 km || 
|-id=793 bgcolor=#d6d6d6
| 263793 ||  || — || August 21, 2008 || Kitt Peak || Spacewatch || 3:2 || align=right | 6.3 km || 
|-id=794 bgcolor=#C2FFFF
| 263794 ||  || — || August 21, 2008 || Kitt Peak || Spacewatch || L4 || align=right | 10 km || 
|-id=795 bgcolor=#C2FFFF
| 263795 ||  || — || August 21, 2008 || Kitt Peak || Spacewatch || L4 || align=right | 8.7 km || 
|-id=796 bgcolor=#C2FFFF
| 263796 ||  || — || August 24, 2008 || Kitt Peak || Spacewatch || L4 || align=right | 9.8 km || 
|-id=797 bgcolor=#C2FFFF
| 263797 ||  || — || September 2, 2008 || Kitt Peak || Spacewatch || L4 || align=right | 10 km || 
|-id=798 bgcolor=#d6d6d6
| 263798 ||  || — || September 2, 2008 || Kitt Peak || Spacewatch || THM || align=right | 2.6 km || 
|-id=799 bgcolor=#C2FFFF
| 263799 ||  || — || September 3, 2008 || Kitt Peak || Spacewatch || L4 || align=right | 11 km || 
|-id=800 bgcolor=#C2FFFF
| 263800 ||  || — || September 4, 2008 || Kitt Peak || Spacewatch || L4 || align=right | 8.2 km || 
|}

263801–263900 

|-bgcolor=#C2FFFF
| 263801 ||  || — || September 4, 2008 || Kitt Peak || Spacewatch || L4 || align=right | 10 km || 
|-id=802 bgcolor=#C2FFFF
| 263802 ||  || — || September 4, 2008 || Kitt Peak || Spacewatch || L4ARK || align=right | 13 km || 
|-id=803 bgcolor=#C2FFFF
| 263803 ||  || — || September 8, 2008 || Dauban || F. Kugel || L4 || align=right | 13 km || 
|-id=804 bgcolor=#C2FFFF
| 263804 ||  || — || September 2, 2008 || Kitt Peak || Spacewatch || L4 || align=right | 13 km || 
|-id=805 bgcolor=#C2FFFF
| 263805 ||  || — || September 2, 2008 || Kitt Peak || Spacewatch || L4 || align=right | 9.1 km || 
|-id=806 bgcolor=#C2FFFF
| 263806 ||  || — || April 25, 2003 || Kitt Peak || Spacewatch || L4 || align=right | 11 km || 
|-id=807 bgcolor=#C2FFFF
| 263807 ||  || — || September 2, 2008 || Kitt Peak || Spacewatch || L4 || align=right | 8.7 km || 
|-id=808 bgcolor=#C2FFFF
| 263808 ||  || — || September 3, 2008 || Kitt Peak || Spacewatch || L4 || align=right | 8.6 km || 
|-id=809 bgcolor=#C2FFFF
| 263809 ||  || — || September 3, 2008 || Kitt Peak || Spacewatch || L4 || align=right | 12 km || 
|-id=810 bgcolor=#C2FFFF
| 263810 ||  || — || September 3, 2008 || Kitt Peak || Spacewatch || L4 || align=right | 8.7 km || 
|-id=811 bgcolor=#C2FFFF
| 263811 ||  || — || September 2, 2008 || Kitt Peak || Spacewatch || L4 || align=right | 8.0 km || 
|-id=812 bgcolor=#C2FFFF
| 263812 ||  || — || September 3, 2008 || Kitt Peak || Spacewatch || L4 || align=right | 7.9 km || 
|-id=813 bgcolor=#d6d6d6
| 263813 ||  || — || September 3, 2008 || Kitt Peak || Spacewatch || 3:2 || align=right | 4.4 km || 
|-id=814 bgcolor=#C2FFFF
| 263814 ||  || — || September 4, 2008 || Kitt Peak || Spacewatch || L4 || align=right | 16 km || 
|-id=815 bgcolor=#C2FFFF
| 263815 ||  || — || September 7, 2008 || Mount Lemmon || Mount Lemmon Survey || L4 || align=right | 9.8 km || 
|-id=816 bgcolor=#C2FFFF
| 263816 ||  || — || September 9, 2008 || Mount Lemmon || Mount Lemmon Survey || L4 || align=right | 13 km || 
|-id=817 bgcolor=#C2FFFF
| 263817 ||  || — || September 2, 2008 || Kitt Peak || Spacewatch || L4 || align=right | 8.4 km || 
|-id=818 bgcolor=#C2FFFF
| 263818 ||  || — || September 5, 2008 || Kitt Peak || Spacewatch || L4 || align=right | 11 km || 
|-id=819 bgcolor=#C2FFFF
| 263819 ||  || — || September 10, 2008 || Kitt Peak || Spacewatch || L4 || align=right | 9.9 km || 
|-id=820 bgcolor=#d6d6d6
| 263820 ||  || — || September 8, 2008 || Bergisch Gladbach || W. Bickel || URS || align=right | 4.9 km || 
|-id=821 bgcolor=#C2FFFF
| 263821 ||  || — || September 20, 2008 || Mount Lemmon || Mount Lemmon Survey || L4 || align=right | 9.0 km || 
|-id=822 bgcolor=#C2FFFF
| 263822 ||  || — || September 20, 2008 || Mount Lemmon || Mount Lemmon Survey || L4ERY || align=right | 13 km || 
|-id=823 bgcolor=#C2FFFF
| 263823 ||  || — || September 23, 2008 || Mount Lemmon || Mount Lemmon Survey || L4 || align=right | 9.5 km || 
|-id=824 bgcolor=#d6d6d6
| 263824 ||  || — || September 23, 2008 || Socorro || LINEAR || EOS || align=right | 5.0 km || 
|-id=825 bgcolor=#C2FFFF
| 263825 ||  || — || September 22, 2008 || Mount Lemmon || Mount Lemmon Survey || L4 || align=right | 15 km || 
|-id=826 bgcolor=#C2FFFF
| 263826 ||  || — || September 24, 2008 || Kitt Peak || Spacewatch || L4 || align=right | 11 km || 
|-id=827 bgcolor=#C2FFFF
| 263827 ||  || — || September 25, 2008 || Mount Lemmon || Mount Lemmon Survey || L4 || align=right | 9.9 km || 
|-id=828 bgcolor=#C2FFFF
| 263828 ||  || — || September 25, 2008 || Mount Lemmon || Mount Lemmon Survey || L4 || align=right | 13 km || 
|-id=829 bgcolor=#C2FFFF
| 263829 ||  || — || September 25, 2008 || Mount Lemmon || Mount Lemmon Survey || L4ERY || align=right | 8.9 km || 
|-id=830 bgcolor=#C2FFFF
| 263830 ||  || — || September 28, 2008 || Mount Lemmon || Mount Lemmon Survey || L4 || align=right | 10 km || 
|-id=831 bgcolor=#C2FFFF
| 263831 ||  || — || September 22, 2008 || Catalina || CSS || L4 || align=right | 12 km || 
|-id=832 bgcolor=#C2FFFF
| 263832 ||  || — || September 24, 2008 || Mount Lemmon || Mount Lemmon Survey || L4 || align=right | 8.7 km || 
|-id=833 bgcolor=#C2FFFF
| 263833 ||  || — || October 2, 2008 || Mount Lemmon || Mount Lemmon Survey || L4ERY || align=right | 11 km || 
|-id=834 bgcolor=#C2FFFF
| 263834 ||  || — || October 2, 2008 || Kitt Peak || Spacewatch || L4 || align=right | 8.2 km || 
|-id=835 bgcolor=#d6d6d6
| 263835 ||  || — || October 2, 2008 || Catalina || CSS || — || align=right | 4.8 km || 
|-id=836 bgcolor=#C2FFFF
| 263836 ||  || — || October 6, 2008 || Kitt Peak || Spacewatch || L4 || align=right | 10 km || 
|-id=837 bgcolor=#C2FFFF
| 263837 ||  || — || October 8, 2008 || Mount Lemmon || Mount Lemmon Survey || L4 || align=right | 8.2 km || 
|-id=838 bgcolor=#d6d6d6
| 263838 ||  || — || October 19, 2008 || Kitt Peak || Spacewatch || CRO || align=right | 5.4 km || 
|-id=839 bgcolor=#fefefe
| 263839 ||  || — || November 20, 2008 || Catalina || CSS || H || align=right data-sort-value="0.76" | 760 m || 
|-id=840 bgcolor=#C2FFFF
| 263840 ||  || — || November 24, 2008 || Kitt Peak || Spacewatch || L4 || align=right | 16 km || 
|-id=841 bgcolor=#E9E9E9
| 263841 ||  || — || December 1, 2008 || Kitt Peak || Spacewatch || — || align=right | 3.8 km || 
|-id=842 bgcolor=#E9E9E9
| 263842 ||  || — || December 30, 2008 || Mount Lemmon || Mount Lemmon Survey || — || align=right | 1.6 km || 
|-id=843 bgcolor=#E9E9E9
| 263843 ||  || — || December 31, 2008 || Kitt Peak || Spacewatch || — || align=right | 2.8 km || 
|-id=844 bgcolor=#E9E9E9
| 263844 Johnfarrell ||  ||  || January 21, 2009 || Kachina || J. Hobart || — || align=right | 3.3 km || 
|-id=845 bgcolor=#fefefe
| 263845 ||  || — || January 21, 2009 || Socorro || LINEAR || H || align=right | 1.1 km || 
|-id=846 bgcolor=#fefefe
| 263846 ||  || — || January 25, 2009 || Socorro || LINEAR || H || align=right data-sort-value="0.71" | 710 m || 
|-id=847 bgcolor=#fefefe
| 263847 ||  || — || January 16, 2009 || Kitt Peak || Spacewatch || — || align=right data-sort-value="0.71" | 710 m || 
|-id=848 bgcolor=#fefefe
| 263848 ||  || — || January 16, 2009 || Kitt Peak || Spacewatch || MAS || align=right | 1.0 km || 
|-id=849 bgcolor=#fefefe
| 263849 ||  || — || January 31, 2009 || Uccle || T. Pauwels, E. W. Elst || — || align=right | 1.2 km || 
|-id=850 bgcolor=#fefefe
| 263850 ||  || — || January 25, 2009 || Kitt Peak || Spacewatch || — || align=right data-sort-value="0.76" | 760 m || 
|-id=851 bgcolor=#fefefe
| 263851 ||  || — || January 31, 2009 || Mount Lemmon || Mount Lemmon Survey || NYS || align=right data-sort-value="0.88" | 880 m || 
|-id=852 bgcolor=#fefefe
| 263852 ||  || — || January 31, 2009 || Kitt Peak || Spacewatch || — || align=right | 1.2 km || 
|-id=853 bgcolor=#fefefe
| 263853 ||  || — || January 31, 2009 || Kitt Peak || Spacewatch || — || align=right data-sort-value="0.98" | 980 m || 
|-id=854 bgcolor=#fefefe
| 263854 ||  || — || January 29, 2009 || Kitt Peak || Spacewatch || — || align=right data-sort-value="0.91" | 910 m || 
|-id=855 bgcolor=#fefefe
| 263855 ||  || — || January 30, 2009 || Kitt Peak || Spacewatch || — || align=right data-sort-value="0.57" | 570 m || 
|-id=856 bgcolor=#E9E9E9
| 263856 ||  || — || January 30, 2009 || Mount Lemmon || Mount Lemmon Survey || — || align=right | 1.5 km || 
|-id=857 bgcolor=#fefefe
| 263857 ||  || — || January 31, 2009 || Kitt Peak || Spacewatch || — || align=right | 1.2 km || 
|-id=858 bgcolor=#fefefe
| 263858 ||  || — || January 17, 2009 || Kitt Peak || Spacewatch || — || align=right | 1.2 km || 
|-id=859 bgcolor=#fefefe
| 263859 ||  || — || January 30, 2009 || Mount Lemmon || Mount Lemmon Survey || NYS || align=right data-sort-value="0.81" | 810 m || 
|-id=860 bgcolor=#fefefe
| 263860 ||  || — || February 1, 2009 || Mount Lemmon || Mount Lemmon Survey || FLO || align=right data-sort-value="0.67" | 670 m || 
|-id=861 bgcolor=#fefefe
| 263861 ||  || — || February 1, 2009 || Kitt Peak || Spacewatch || — || align=right | 2.3 km || 
|-id=862 bgcolor=#fefefe
| 263862 ||  || — || February 17, 2009 || Dauban || F. Kugel || V || align=right data-sort-value="0.93" | 930 m || 
|-id=863 bgcolor=#E9E9E9
| 263863 ||  || — || February 18, 2009 || Socorro || LINEAR || — || align=right | 2.7 km || 
|-id=864 bgcolor=#fefefe
| 263864 ||  || — || February 17, 2009 || La Sagra || OAM Obs. || — || align=right data-sort-value="0.87" | 870 m || 
|-id=865 bgcolor=#E9E9E9
| 263865 ||  || — || February 20, 2009 || Catalina || CSS || — || align=right | 1.8 km || 
|-id=866 bgcolor=#fefefe
| 263866 ||  || — || February 20, 2009 || Kitt Peak || Spacewatch || — || align=right data-sort-value="0.97" | 970 m || 
|-id=867 bgcolor=#d6d6d6
| 263867 ||  || — || February 20, 2009 || Kitt Peak || Spacewatch || HYG || align=right | 4.5 km || 
|-id=868 bgcolor=#fefefe
| 263868 ||  || — || February 16, 2009 || Catalina || CSS || H || align=right data-sort-value="0.63" | 630 m || 
|-id=869 bgcolor=#fefefe
| 263869 ||  || — || February 19, 2009 || La Sagra || OAM Obs. || V || align=right data-sort-value="0.76" | 760 m || 
|-id=870 bgcolor=#fefefe
| 263870 ||  || — || February 21, 2009 || Socorro || LINEAR || LCI || align=right | 2.2 km || 
|-id=871 bgcolor=#E9E9E9
| 263871 ||  || — || February 28, 2009 || Socorro || LINEAR || — || align=right | 2.4 km || 
|-id=872 bgcolor=#fefefe
| 263872 ||  || — || February 19, 2009 || Kitt Peak || Spacewatch || — || align=right data-sort-value="0.80" | 800 m || 
|-id=873 bgcolor=#fefefe
| 263873 ||  || — || February 21, 2009 || Mount Lemmon || Mount Lemmon Survey || — || align=right data-sort-value="0.87" | 870 m || 
|-id=874 bgcolor=#E9E9E9
| 263874 ||  || — || February 24, 2009 || Kitt Peak || Spacewatch || — || align=right | 1.8 km || 
|-id=875 bgcolor=#E9E9E9
| 263875 ||  || — || February 26, 2009 || Kitt Peak || Spacewatch || ADE || align=right | 3.4 km || 
|-id=876 bgcolor=#E9E9E9
| 263876 ||  || — || February 19, 2009 || Kitt Peak || Spacewatch || — || align=right | 1.1 km || 
|-id=877 bgcolor=#fefefe
| 263877 ||  || — || February 19, 2009 || Kitt Peak || Spacewatch || — || align=right data-sort-value="0.75" | 750 m || 
|-id=878 bgcolor=#d6d6d6
| 263878 ||  || — || February 22, 2009 || Siding Spring || SSS || — || align=right | 3.8 km || 
|-id=879 bgcolor=#fefefe
| 263879 ||  || — || February 27, 2009 || Kitt Peak || Spacewatch || MAS || align=right data-sort-value="0.83" | 830 m || 
|-id=880 bgcolor=#fefefe
| 263880 ||  || — || March 1, 2009 || Kitt Peak || Spacewatch || FLO || align=right data-sort-value="0.61" | 610 m || 
|-id=881 bgcolor=#fefefe
| 263881 ||  || — || March 1, 2009 || Kitt Peak || Spacewatch || V || align=right data-sort-value="0.85" | 850 m || 
|-id=882 bgcolor=#fefefe
| 263882 ||  || — || March 15, 2009 || Kitt Peak || Spacewatch || — || align=right | 1.2 km || 
|-id=883 bgcolor=#fefefe
| 263883 ||  || — || March 8, 2009 || Mount Lemmon || Mount Lemmon Survey || — || align=right | 1.0 km || 
|-id=884 bgcolor=#fefefe
| 263884 ||  || — || March 8, 2009 || Mount Lemmon || Mount Lemmon Survey || — || align=right data-sort-value="0.61" | 610 m || 
|-id=885 bgcolor=#fefefe
| 263885 ||  || — || March 15, 2009 || Kitt Peak || Spacewatch || — || align=right data-sort-value="0.90" | 900 m || 
|-id=886 bgcolor=#d6d6d6
| 263886 ||  || — || March 2, 2009 || Kitt Peak || Spacewatch || — || align=right | 2.9 km || 
|-id=887 bgcolor=#fefefe
| 263887 ||  || — || March 16, 2009 || La Sagra || OAM Obs. || — || align=right | 1.0 km || 
|-id=888 bgcolor=#d6d6d6
| 263888 ||  || — || March 17, 2009 || La Sagra || OAM Obs. || — || align=right | 5.2 km || 
|-id=889 bgcolor=#d6d6d6
| 263889 ||  || — || March 17, 2009 || Mayhill || A. Lowe || — || align=right | 2.9 km || 
|-id=890 bgcolor=#E9E9E9
| 263890 ||  || — || March 16, 2009 || Dauban || F. Kugel || — || align=right | 2.1 km || 
|-id=891 bgcolor=#fefefe
| 263891 ||  || — || March 17, 2009 || Dauban || F. Kugel || — || align=right | 1.3 km || 
|-id=892 bgcolor=#fefefe
| 263892 ||  || — || March 17, 2009 || Dauban || F. Kugel || FLO || align=right | 1.1 km || 
|-id=893 bgcolor=#fefefe
| 263893 ||  || — || March 18, 2009 || La Sagra || OAM Obs. || — || align=right data-sort-value="0.99" | 990 m || 
|-id=894 bgcolor=#E9E9E9
| 263894 ||  || — || March 16, 2009 || La Sagra || OAM Obs. || EUN || align=right | 1.4 km || 
|-id=895 bgcolor=#E9E9E9
| 263895 ||  || — || March 19, 2009 || La Sagra || OAM Obs. || MAR || align=right | 1.4 km || 
|-id=896 bgcolor=#fefefe
| 263896 ||  || — || March 20, 2009 || La Sagra || OAM Obs. || — || align=right | 1.1 km || 
|-id=897 bgcolor=#fefefe
| 263897 ||  || — || March 21, 2009 || Dauban || F. Kugel || — || align=right data-sort-value="0.88" | 880 m || 
|-id=898 bgcolor=#fefefe
| 263898 ||  || — || March 19, 2009 || Socorro || LINEAR || FLO || align=right data-sort-value="0.77" | 770 m || 
|-id=899 bgcolor=#E9E9E9
| 263899 ||  || — || March 19, 2009 || Kitt Peak || Spacewatch || KRM || align=right | 2.8 km || 
|-id=900 bgcolor=#E9E9E9
| 263900 ||  || — || March 16, 2009 || La Sagra || OAM Obs. || — || align=right | 1.8 km || 
|}

263901–264000 

|-bgcolor=#E9E9E9
| 263901 ||  || — || March 23, 2009 || La Sagra || OAM Obs. || — || align=right | 2.7 km || 
|-id=902 bgcolor=#fefefe
| 263902 ||  || — || March 24, 2009 || Mount Lemmon || Mount Lemmon Survey || V || align=right data-sort-value="0.74" | 740 m || 
|-id=903 bgcolor=#FA8072
| 263903 ||  || — || March 22, 2009 || Mount Lemmon || Mount Lemmon Survey || — || align=right | 1.2 km || 
|-id=904 bgcolor=#E9E9E9
| 263904 ||  || — || March 23, 2009 || Purple Mountain || PMO NEO || — || align=right | 2.1 km || 
|-id=905 bgcolor=#fefefe
| 263905 ||  || — || March 25, 2009 || Mount Lemmon || Mount Lemmon Survey || FLO || align=right data-sort-value="0.59" | 590 m || 
|-id=906 bgcolor=#fefefe
| 263906 Yuanfengfang ||  ||  || March 21, 2009 || Lulin Observatory || Z.-W. Jin, C.-S. Lin || FLO || align=right data-sort-value="0.77" | 770 m || 
|-id=907 bgcolor=#fefefe
| 263907 ||  || — || March 27, 2009 || Kitt Peak || Spacewatch || — || align=right | 1.0 km || 
|-id=908 bgcolor=#fefefe
| 263908 ||  || — || March 27, 2009 || Kitt Peak || Spacewatch || — || align=right | 1.0 km || 
|-id=909 bgcolor=#E9E9E9
| 263909 ||  || — || March 30, 2009 || Hibiscus || N. Teamo || — || align=right | 2.2 km || 
|-id=910 bgcolor=#E9E9E9
| 263910 ||  || — || March 28, 2009 || Mount Lemmon || Mount Lemmon Survey || ADE || align=right | 2.2 km || 
|-id=911 bgcolor=#d6d6d6
| 263911 ||  || — || March 17, 2009 || Kitt Peak || Spacewatch || — || align=right | 2.9 km || 
|-id=912 bgcolor=#E9E9E9
| 263912 ||  || — || March 29, 2009 || Kitt Peak || Spacewatch || — || align=right | 1.2 km || 
|-id=913 bgcolor=#E9E9E9
| 263913 ||  || — || March 31, 2009 || Mount Lemmon || Mount Lemmon Survey || — || align=right | 1.5 km || 
|-id=914 bgcolor=#E9E9E9
| 263914 ||  || — || March 19, 2009 || Kitt Peak || Spacewatch || — || align=right | 2.8 km || 
|-id=915 bgcolor=#fefefe
| 263915 ||  || — || March 24, 2009 || Kitt Peak || Spacewatch || — || align=right | 1.0 km || 
|-id=916 bgcolor=#E9E9E9
| 263916 ||  || — || March 24, 2009 || Kitt Peak || Spacewatch || — || align=right data-sort-value="0.90" | 900 m || 
|-id=917 bgcolor=#fefefe
| 263917 ||  || — || March 17, 2009 || Kitt Peak || Spacewatch || — || align=right data-sort-value="0.97" | 970 m || 
|-id=918 bgcolor=#fefefe
| 263918 ||  || — || March 18, 2009 || Kitt Peak || Spacewatch || — || align=right data-sort-value="0.97" | 970 m || 
|-id=919 bgcolor=#fefefe
| 263919 ||  || — || March 18, 2009 || Catalina || CSS || — || align=right | 1.2 km || 
|-id=920 bgcolor=#E9E9E9
| 263920 ||  || — || March 18, 2009 || Kitt Peak || Spacewatch || — || align=right | 1.6 km || 
|-id=921 bgcolor=#d6d6d6
| 263921 ||  || — || April 15, 2009 || Socorro || LINEAR || — || align=right | 5.0 km || 
|-id=922 bgcolor=#fefefe
| 263922 ||  || — || April 16, 2009 || Catalina || CSS || NYS || align=right data-sort-value="0.84" | 840 m || 
|-id=923 bgcolor=#fefefe
| 263923 ||  || — || April 17, 2009 || Catalina || CSS || — || align=right data-sort-value="0.83" | 830 m || 
|-id=924 bgcolor=#E9E9E9
| 263924 ||  || — || April 17, 2009 || Kitt Peak || Spacewatch || — || align=right data-sort-value="0.91" | 910 m || 
|-id=925 bgcolor=#E9E9E9
| 263925 ||  || — || April 19, 2009 || Kitt Peak || Spacewatch || — || align=right | 2.3 km || 
|-id=926 bgcolor=#fefefe
| 263926 ||  || — || April 17, 2009 || Catalina || CSS || — || align=right | 2.7 km || 
|-id=927 bgcolor=#fefefe
| 263927 ||  || — || April 18, 2009 || Kitt Peak || Spacewatch || NYS || align=right data-sort-value="0.68" | 680 m || 
|-id=928 bgcolor=#d6d6d6
| 263928 ||  || — || April 20, 2009 || La Sagra || OAM Obs. || — || align=right | 3.1 km || 
|-id=929 bgcolor=#E9E9E9
| 263929 ||  || — || April 17, 2009 || Catalina || CSS || — || align=right | 2.3 km || 
|-id=930 bgcolor=#d6d6d6
| 263930 ||  || — || April 20, 2009 || Kitt Peak || Spacewatch || — || align=right | 3.7 km || 
|-id=931 bgcolor=#E9E9E9
| 263931 ||  || — || April 20, 2009 || Kitt Peak || Spacewatch || WIT || align=right | 1.3 km || 
|-id=932 bgcolor=#E9E9E9
| 263932 Speyer ||  ||  || April 22, 2009 || Tzec Maun || E. Schwab || JUN || align=right | 1.1 km || 
|-id=933 bgcolor=#fefefe
| 263933 ||  || — || April 21, 2009 || La Sagra || OAM Obs. || — || align=right data-sort-value="0.97" | 970 m || 
|-id=934 bgcolor=#E9E9E9
| 263934 ||  || — || April 19, 2009 || Kitt Peak || Spacewatch || — || align=right | 2.3 km || 
|-id=935 bgcolor=#fefefe
| 263935 ||  || — || April 19, 2009 || Mount Lemmon || Mount Lemmon Survey || FLO || align=right data-sort-value="0.67" | 670 m || 
|-id=936 bgcolor=#E9E9E9
| 263936 ||  || — || April 20, 2009 || Kitt Peak || Spacewatch || — || align=right | 3.3 km || 
|-id=937 bgcolor=#fefefe
| 263937 ||  || — || April 20, 2009 || Kitt Peak || Spacewatch || — || align=right data-sort-value="0.84" | 840 m || 
|-id=938 bgcolor=#fefefe
| 263938 ||  || — || April 20, 2009 || Kitt Peak || Spacewatch || V || align=right data-sort-value="0.73" | 730 m || 
|-id=939 bgcolor=#E9E9E9
| 263939 ||  || — || April 23, 2009 || Marly || P. Kocher || — || align=right | 1.9 km || 
|-id=940 bgcolor=#fefefe
| 263940 Malyshkina ||  ||  || April 20, 2009 || Zelenchukskaya || T. V. Kryachko || — || align=right | 1.0 km || 
|-id=941 bgcolor=#E9E9E9
| 263941 ||  || — || April 23, 2009 || Kitt Peak || Spacewatch || — || align=right | 2.9 km || 
|-id=942 bgcolor=#E9E9E9
| 263942 ||  || — || April 22, 2009 || Mount Lemmon || Mount Lemmon Survey || AGN || align=right | 1.1 km || 
|-id=943 bgcolor=#E9E9E9
| 263943 ||  || — || April 27, 2009 || Mount Lemmon || Mount Lemmon Survey || — || align=right | 1.5 km || 
|-id=944 bgcolor=#fefefe
| 263944 ||  || — || April 28, 2009 || Catalina || CSS || FLO || align=right data-sort-value="0.84" | 840 m || 
|-id=945 bgcolor=#E9E9E9
| 263945 ||  || — || April 28, 2009 || Catalina || CSS || HEN || align=right | 1.5 km || 
|-id=946 bgcolor=#E9E9E9
| 263946 ||  || — || April 30, 2009 || Mount Lemmon || Mount Lemmon Survey || WIT || align=right | 1.1 km || 
|-id=947 bgcolor=#E9E9E9
| 263947 ||  || — || April 24, 2009 || La Sagra || OAM Obs. || — || align=right | 3.2 km || 
|-id=948 bgcolor=#E9E9E9
| 263948 ||  || — || April 23, 2009 || La Sagra || OAM Obs. || — || align=right | 1.8 km || 
|-id=949 bgcolor=#E9E9E9
| 263949 ||  || — || April 30, 2009 || La Sagra || OAM Obs. || POS || align=right | 3.5 km || 
|-id=950 bgcolor=#E9E9E9
| 263950 ||  || — || April 28, 2009 || Cerro Burek || Alianza S4 Obs. || — || align=right | 3.2 km || 
|-id=951 bgcolor=#E9E9E9
| 263951 ||  || — || April 27, 2009 || Moletai || K. Černis, J. Zdanavičius || — || align=right | 2.8 km || 
|-id=952 bgcolor=#E9E9E9
| 263952 ||  || — || April 19, 2009 || Kitt Peak || Spacewatch || — || align=right | 2.6 km || 
|-id=953 bgcolor=#d6d6d6
| 263953 ||  || — || April 19, 2009 || Kitt Peak || Spacewatch || — || align=right | 2.8 km || 
|-id=954 bgcolor=#E9E9E9
| 263954 ||  || — || April 20, 2009 || Kitt Peak || Spacewatch || — || align=right | 1.6 km || 
|-id=955 bgcolor=#d6d6d6
| 263955 ||  || — || April 23, 2009 || Kitt Peak || Spacewatch || — || align=right | 3.0 km || 
|-id=956 bgcolor=#E9E9E9
| 263956 ||  || — || April 18, 2009 || Kitt Peak || Spacewatch || — || align=right | 1.7 km || 
|-id=957 bgcolor=#d6d6d6
| 263957 ||  || — || April 18, 2009 || Mount Lemmon || Mount Lemmon Survey || EOS || align=right | 2.6 km || 
|-id=958 bgcolor=#fefefe
| 263958 ||  || — || April 19, 2009 || Kitt Peak || Spacewatch || V || align=right data-sort-value="0.83" | 830 m || 
|-id=959 bgcolor=#d6d6d6
| 263959 ||  || — || May 2, 2009 || La Sagra || OAM Obs. || — || align=right | 4.3 km || 
|-id=960 bgcolor=#d6d6d6
| 263960 ||  || — || May 3, 2009 || La Sagra || OAM Obs. || — || align=right | 4.1 km || 
|-id=961 bgcolor=#E9E9E9
| 263961 ||  || — || May 2, 2009 || Purple Mountain || PMO NEO || — || align=right | 1.6 km || 
|-id=962 bgcolor=#d6d6d6
| 263962 ||  || — || May 13, 2009 || Kitt Peak || Spacewatch || TEL || align=right | 1.8 km || 
|-id=963 bgcolor=#E9E9E9
| 263963 ||  || — || May 1, 2009 || Cerro Burek || Alianza S4 Obs. || — || align=right | 1.5 km || 
|-id=964 bgcolor=#fefefe
| 263964 ||  || — || May 13, 2009 || Mount Lemmon || Mount Lemmon Survey || — || align=right | 1.0 km || 
|-id=965 bgcolor=#fefefe
| 263965 ||  || — || May 13, 2009 || Kitt Peak || Spacewatch || NYS || align=right data-sort-value="0.69" | 690 m || 
|-id=966 bgcolor=#E9E9E9
| 263966 ||  || — || May 13, 2009 || Kitt Peak || Spacewatch || WIT || align=right | 1.4 km || 
|-id=967 bgcolor=#E9E9E9
| 263967 ||  || — || May 13, 2009 || Kitt Peak || Spacewatch || — || align=right | 1.5 km || 
|-id=968 bgcolor=#d6d6d6
| 263968 ||  || — || May 15, 2009 || Kitt Peak || Spacewatch || — || align=right | 4.0 km || 
|-id=969 bgcolor=#d6d6d6
| 263969 ||  || — || May 2, 2009 || La Sagra || OAM Obs. || — || align=right | 3.4 km || 
|-id=970 bgcolor=#E9E9E9
| 263970 ||  || — || May 1, 2009 || Mount Lemmon || Mount Lemmon Survey || — || align=right | 1.7 km || 
|-id=971 bgcolor=#d6d6d6
| 263971 ||  || — || May 17, 2009 || Dauban || F. Kugel || — || align=right | 3.8 km || 
|-id=972 bgcolor=#d6d6d6
| 263972 ||  || — || May 17, 2009 || Dauban || F. Kugel || — || align=right | 3.3 km || 
|-id=973 bgcolor=#E9E9E9
| 263973 ||  || — || May 18, 2009 || La Sagra || OAM Obs. || — || align=right | 5.4 km || 
|-id=974 bgcolor=#E9E9E9
| 263974 ||  || — || May 19, 2009 || La Sagra || OAM Obs. || — || align=right | 1.5 km || 
|-id=975 bgcolor=#fefefe
| 263975 ||  || — || May 24, 2009 || Skylive Obs. || F. Tozzi || H || align=right data-sort-value="0.78" | 780 m || 
|-id=976 bgcolor=#FFC2E0
| 263976 ||  || — || May 26, 2009 || La Sagra || OAM Obs. || APOPHAcritical || align=right data-sort-value="0.79" | 790 m || 
|-id=977 bgcolor=#fefefe
| 263977 ||  || — || May 26, 2009 || La Sagra || OAM Obs. || ERI || align=right | 1.8 km || 
|-id=978 bgcolor=#fefefe
| 263978 ||  || — || May 18, 2009 || La Sagra || OAM Obs. || — || align=right data-sort-value="0.94" | 940 m || 
|-id=979 bgcolor=#E9E9E9
| 263979 ||  || — || May 28, 2009 || La Sagra || OAM Obs. || JUN || align=right | 4.6 km || 
|-id=980 bgcolor=#E9E9E9
| 263980 ||  || — || May 25, 2009 || Kitt Peak || Spacewatch || — || align=right | 3.1 km || 
|-id=981 bgcolor=#fefefe
| 263981 ||  || — || May 26, 2009 || Kitt Peak || Spacewatch || ERI || align=right | 2.4 km || 
|-id=982 bgcolor=#d6d6d6
| 263982 ||  || — || May 26, 2009 || Kitt Peak || Spacewatch || — || align=right | 4.6 km || 
|-id=983 bgcolor=#fefefe
| 263983 ||  || — || May 17, 2009 || Mount Lemmon || Mount Lemmon Survey || — || align=right data-sort-value="0.87" | 870 m || 
|-id=984 bgcolor=#fefefe
| 263984 ||  || — || May 16, 2009 || Mount Lemmon || Mount Lemmon Survey || ERI || align=right | 1.4 km || 
|-id=985 bgcolor=#E9E9E9
| 263985 ||  || — || May 26, 2009 || Catalina || CSS || RAF || align=right | 1.4 km || 
|-id=986 bgcolor=#d6d6d6
| 263986 ||  || — || May 28, 2009 || Mount Lemmon || Mount Lemmon Survey || HYG || align=right | 3.1 km || 
|-id=987 bgcolor=#d6d6d6
| 263987 ||  || — || May 30, 2009 || Mount Lemmon || Mount Lemmon Survey || — || align=right | 2.5 km || 
|-id=988 bgcolor=#fefefe
| 263988 ||  || — || June 12, 2009 || Kitt Peak || Spacewatch || — || align=right | 1.1 km || 
|-id=989 bgcolor=#E9E9E9
| 263989 ||  || — || June 12, 2009 || Bergisch Gladbac || W. Bickel || — || align=right | 2.6 km || 
|-id=990 bgcolor=#d6d6d6
| 263990 ||  || — || June 14, 2009 || Kitt Peak || Spacewatch || VER || align=right | 3.6 km || 
|-id=991 bgcolor=#d6d6d6
| 263991 ||  || — || June 21, 2009 || Skylive Obs. || F. Tozzi || — || align=right | 7.9 km || 
|-id=992 bgcolor=#fefefe
| 263992 ||  || — || June 21, 2009 || Kitt Peak || Spacewatch || — || align=right | 1.6 km || 
|-id=993 bgcolor=#d6d6d6
| 263993 ||  || — || June 27, 2009 || La Sagra || OAM Obs. || — || align=right | 6.1 km || 
|-id=994 bgcolor=#E9E9E9
| 263994 ||  || — || June 23, 2009 || Mount Lemmon || Mount Lemmon Survey || JUN || align=right | 1.2 km || 
|-id=995 bgcolor=#d6d6d6
| 263995 ||  || — || June 23, 2009 || Mount Lemmon || Mount Lemmon Survey || — || align=right | 3.6 km || 
|-id=996 bgcolor=#E9E9E9
| 263996 ||  || — || July 15, 2009 || La Sagra || OAM Obs. || — || align=right | 3.4 km || 
|-id=997 bgcolor=#fefefe
| 263997 ||  || — || July 18, 2009 || La Sagra || OAM Obs. || — || align=right data-sort-value="0.91" | 910 m || 
|-id=998 bgcolor=#d6d6d6
| 263998 ||  || — || July 17, 2009 || La Sagra || OAM Obs. || — || align=right | 4.4 km || 
|-id=999 bgcolor=#d6d6d6
| 263999 ||  || — || July 19, 2009 || La Sagra || OAM Obs. || EOS || align=right | 2.7 km || 
|-id=000 bgcolor=#fefefe
| 264000 ||  || — || July 19, 2009 || La Sagra || OAM Obs. || — || align=right | 1.2 km || 
|}

References

External links 
 Discovery Circumstances: Numbered Minor Planets (260001)–(265000) (IAU Minor Planet Center)

0263